

Events
Below, the events of World War II have the "WWII" prefix.

January

 January 1 – WWII: The Declaration by United Nations is signed by China, the United Kingdom, the United States, the Soviet Union, and 22 other nations, in which they agree "not to make any separate peace with the Axis powers".
 January 5 – WWII: Two prisoners, British officer Airey Neave and Dutch officer Anthony Luteyn, escape from Colditz Castle in Germany. After travelling for three days, they reach the Swiss border.
 January 7 – WWII:
 Battle of Slim River: Japanese forces of the 5th Division, supported by tanks, sweep through sixteen miles of British defenses, shattering the exhausted 11th Indian Division and inflicting some 3,000 casualties.
 Operation Typhoon, the German attempt to take Moscow, ends in failure.
 January 11 – WWII:
 Dutch East Indies campaign: Japan declares war on the Netherlands and the Dutch East Indies. Japanese forces invade Borneo and Celebes.
 Malayan Campaign: The Japanese capture Kuala Lumpur, the capital of the Federated Malay States.
 January 13
 Heinkel test pilot Helmut Schenk becomes the first person to escape from a stricken aircraft with an ejection seat.
 Henry Ford patents a plastic automobile that would be 30% lighter than a conventional car.
 January 14
 WWII: "Second Happy Time", the German submarine commanders' name for Operation Paukenschlag (Operation Drumbeat), the phase in the Battle of the Atlantic during which German submarines are successful in attacking Allied shipping along the East Coast of the United States, opens early this morning when German submarine U-123 under the command of Reinhard Hardegen sinks a Norwegian tanker within sight of Long Island, before entering New York Harbor and sinking a British tanker off Sandy Hook the following night, as she leaves heading south along the coast. U-boat successes continue until around June 12.
 The Sikorsky R-4 first flies in the United States; it will become the first mass-produced helicopter.
 January 16 – American film actress Carole Lombard and her mother are among all 22 killed aboard TWA Flight 3 when the Douglas DC-3 plane crashes into Potosi Mountain near Las Vegas while she is returning from a tour to promote the sale of war bonds.
 January 17 – WWII: South African forces of the British 8th Army conquer the Halfaya Pass ("Hellfire Pass"). The Halfaya garrison of 4,200 men of the Italian 55th Division "Savona" and 2,100 Germans surrender. 
 January 19 – WWII:
 Japanese forces invade Burma.
 The following Commands of the United States Eighth Air Force are established: VIII Bomber Command initially at Langley Field in Virginia, and VIII Fighter Command at Selfridge Field in Michigan.
 January 20 – The Holocaust: Nazis at the Wannsee Conference in Berlin decide that the "Final Solution (Endlösung) to the Jewish problem" is deportations to extermination camps.
 January 21 – WWII: Erwin Rommel launches his new offensive in Cyrenaica.
 January 23 – WWII: The Battle of Rabaul begins. Before dawn, 5,000 troops of Japan's elite South Seas Detachment storm ashore at Rabaul. With control of the air and support from the guns of their own ships, the Japanese overwhelm the small Australian garrison, the majority is either killed or captured. 
 January 25 – WWII: 
 German forces under Erwin Rommel of Panzer Group Afrika reaches Msus. General Alfred Godwin-Austin orders the 4th Indian Division from the British 13th Corps to evacuate Benghazi.
 Thailand declares war on the United States and the United Kingdom.
 January 26 – WWII: The first American forces arrive in Europe, landing in Northern Ireland.
 January 31 – WWII: Malayan Campaign: The last organized Allied forces leave British Malaya, ending the 54-day campaign, and the Johor–Singapore Causeway is severed.

February

 February 1 – WWII:
 Marshalls–Gilberts raids: Admiral William Halsey Jr sends airstrikes from the carrier USS Enterprise against Kwajalein, Taroa, Wotje in the Marshall Islands. At the same time, cruisers and destroyers bombard Taroa and Wotje. The strikes inflict light to moderate damage on the three islands' naval garrisons, sink three warships and damage several others, including the light cruiser Katori and damage 15 Japanese aircraft. Further south, the carrier USS Yorktown attacks Jaluit, Mili and Makin in the Gilbert Islands. They inflict moderate damage to the Japanese naval installations and destroy three aircraft. 
 The Kriegsmarine introduces the M4 (German Navy 4-rotor) Enigma machine for U-boat traffic, blinding Allied cryptanalysts to their radio signals for most of the year.
 The Command staff of the United States Eighth Air Force reaches England.
 Mao Zedong makes a speech on "Reform in Learning, the Party and Literature", starting the Yan'an Rectification Movement in the Chinese Communist Party.
 February 3 – WWII: Rommel suspends his offensive in Cyrenaica.
 February 7 – United States Maritime Commission fleet operations are transferred to the War Shipping Administration (lasting until September 1, 1946).
 February 8 – WWII:
 Battle of Singapore: Japanese forces of the 5th Division and 18th Division (some 23,000 men) begin to cross the Johor Strait and attack the Australian 22nd Brigade (some 3,000 men) at Singapore. 
 Top United States military leaders hold their first formal meeting to discuss American military strategy in the war.
 António Óscar Carmona is elected president of Portugal.
 Daylight saving time goes into effect in the United States.
 February 9 – The ocean liner  catches fire while being converted into the troopship USS Lafayette (AP-53) for WWII at Pier 88 in New York City; she capsizes early the following morning.
 February 11–13 – WWII: Operation Cerberus: A Kriegsmarine (German navy) squadron comprising the Scharnhorst and Gneisenau, heavy cruiser Prinz Eugen and their escort, dash from Brest through the English Channel to German ports; the British fail to sink any of them.
 February 14–18 – Battle of Bilin River: Indian forces of the 17th Division under General John Snyth are ordered to halt the Japanese advance but are outflanked and retreat to the Sittang River. 
 February 14 – WWII: 
 Battle of Palembang: Japanese paratroopers (240 men) are dropped near Palembang, and capture the oil refinery complex undamaged. Dutch forces counter-attack and manage to retake the complex but take heavy losses. A planned demolition fails to do any serious damage to the refinery, but the oil stores are set ablaze.
 The , Scottish steamship, is bombed and sunk by Japanese planes while evacuating nurses and wounded servicemen from Singapore. Rescue boats with many survivors reach Bangka Island.
 February 15 – WWII: Fall of Singapore: Commonwealth forces under General Arthur Percival surrender to the Japanese 25th Army. About 80,000 British, Indian, Australian, and local troops become prisoners of war, joining the 50,000 soldiers taken in the Malayan campaign. 
 February 16 – WWII: Bangka Island Massacre: Japanese soldiers machine-gun 22 Australian Army nurses and 60 Australian and British soldiers and crew who have survived the sinking of SS Vyner Brooke.
 February 18 – WWII:
 Japanese occupation of Singapore: Sook Ching – Japanese forces begin the systematic extermination of perceived hostile elements among Chinese Singaporeans.
 More than 200 American sailors die in Newfoundland when  runs aground near Chambers Cove and  runs aground at Lawn Point.
 February 19 – WWII:
 Bombing of Darwin: The Japanese 1st Air Fleet under Admiral Chūichi Nagumo bombs Darwin, Australia. This force comprises the aircraft carriers Akagi, Kaga, Hiryū and Sōryū and a powerful force of escorting surface ships. During the attack, 188 planes led by Mitsuo Fuchida destroy 11 vessels and wreck a lot of the harbor infrastructure, killing some 240 people.
 A returning Japanese fighter plane crashes on Melville Island (Australia) and its pilot, Hajime Toyoshima, becomes the first Japanese captured on Australian soil, when indigenous resident Matthias Ulungura takes him prisoner. 
 President Franklin D. Roosevelt signs Executive Order 9066, allowing the United States military to define areas as exclusionary zones. These zones affect the Japanese on the West Coast, and Germans and Italians primarily on the East Coast.
 February 19–23 – WWII: Battle of Sittang Bridge: Indian forces of the 17th Division are ordered to defend the Sittang Bridge, but eventually blow up the bridge to halt the Japanese advance to Rangoon. Survivors of the 17th Division (some 3.500 soldiers) swam and ferried themselves over the Sittang River.
 February 20 – Lieutenant Edward O'Hare becomes America's first U.S. Navy flying ace of the war.
 February 21 – WWII: Invasion of Sumatra: Japanese forces of the 38th Division under General Tadayoshi Sano capture Tanjungkarang airfield, which is put to work for air operations against Java.
 February 22 – WWII: General George Marshall transmits a direct order to General MacArthur in President Roosevelt's name, ordering MacArthur himself to turn over command of the Philippines to a subordinate, and report to Australia to assume command of the large American force being built up there. The orders are worded to allow MacArthur to choose the exact moment of his departure; for various reasons, he will not leave until March 11.
 February 23 – WWII:  fires 17 high-explosive shells toward an oil refinery near Santa Barbara, California, causing little damage.
 February 24
 Propaganda: The Voice of America begins broadcasting.
 Internment of Japanese Canadians is ordered.
 February 25 – "Battle of Los Angeles": Over 1,400 AA shells are fired at an unidentified, slow-moving object (probably a meteorological balloon) in the skies over Los Angeles. The appearance of the object triggers an immediate wartime blackout over most of Southern California, with thousands of air raid wardens being deployed throughout the city. At least 5 deaths are related to the incident. Despite the several-hour barrages no planes are downed.
 February 26 – The 14th Academy Awards ceremony is held in Los Angeles; How Green Was My Valley wins Best Picture.
 February 27 – WWII: 
 Battle of the Java Sea: An allied (ABDA) task force of 14 vessels under Dutch command, trying to stem a Japanese invasion of the Dutch East Indies, is defeated by a 19-vessel Japanese task force in the Java Sea; 2.300 sailors die, including the commander, Admiral Karel Doorman; Japanese attain naval hegemony in East-Asia.
 The USS Langley, first aircraft carrier of the United States Navy, is attacked by 9 Japanese bombers while ferrying a cargo of USAAF P-40 fighters to Java. Langley is so badly damaged that she has to be scuttled to avoid falling into Japanese hands.

March

 March 1 – WWII: Japanese forces of the 2nd Division land in Port of Merak on western Java with the intention to advance on Batavia.
 March 4 – WWII: Operation K: The Japanese launch an unsuccessful attack carried out by two Kawanishi H8K ("Emily") flying boats at Pearl Harbor. This is the longest distance ever undertaken by a two-plane bombing mission, and one of the longest bombing sorties ever planned without fighter escort.
 March 5 – WWII: Japanese forces of the 16th Army under General Hitoshi Imamura enter triumphantly the Dutch colonial capital of Batavia without opposition.
 March 6 – WWII: Yugoslav Partisans, operating in Nazi-occupied Serbia, assassinate Đorđe Kosmajac in Belgrade. 
 March 8–13 – Invasion of Salamaua–Lae: Japanese forces invade and occupy the Salamaua–Lae area in the Territory of New Guinea to establish an air base for the support of further operations in the region. A small Australian garrison (some 200 men) in the area withdraws to Wau after executing demolition operations to prevent the use of their facilities for the invaders. In response to the Japanese landings, Task Force 17 with aircraft carriers Lexington and Yorktown led by Admiral Wilson Brown, attacks the invading naval forces and destroys three transports, and damages the cruiser Yūbari and several other ships.
 March 8 – WWII: Japanese forces of the 33rd Division under General Shōzō Sakurai capture Rangoon. The Allies manage to escape and try to make a stand in central Burma.
 March 9 – WWII: 
Executive order 9082 (February 28, 1942) comes into effect, reorganizing the United States Army into three major commands: Army Ground Forces, Army Air Forces, and Services of Supply, later redesignated Army Service Forces, with Henry H. Arnold as Commanding General of the United States Army Air Forces.
 The Dutch Commander-in-Chief of the Allied forces on Java, General Ter Poorten, surrenders to the Japanese. Ter Poorten's surrender announcement is made without consulting the commanders of the British and US forces, who want to continue the war. 
 March 11 – WWII: Douglas MacArthur's escape from the Philippines – U.S. General Douglas MacArthur, his family and key members of his staff are evacuated by PT boat, under cover of evening darkness, from Corregidor in the Philippines. Command of U.S. forces in the Philippines passes to Major General Jonathan M. Wainwright.
 March 12 – WWII: American troops land at Nouméa on New Caledonia to build a base and garrison the island. This landing includes the first Seabees that are out on active service. The Seabees are Naval Construction battalions, and their name comes from the C and B in construction battalion.
 March 15 – WWII: Dünamünde Action: 1,900 central European Jews are shot dead north east of Riga, 1,840 are killed on the 26th.
 March 16 – WWII: New Zealand and Australia declare war on Thailand.
 March 17 – The Holocaust: Operation Reinhard – The Nazi German Bełżec extermination camp opens in occupied Poland, about 1 km south of the railroad station at Bełżec in the Lublin district of the General Government. At least 434,508 people are killed here up to December 1942.
 March 18 – Franklin D. Roosevelt, President of the United States, signs Executive Order 9102, creating the War Relocation Authority (WRA), which becomes responsible for the internment of Americans of Japanese and, to a lesser extent, German and Italian descent, many of them legal citizens.
 March 19–30 – WWII: Battle of Toungoo: Chinese forces under General Dai Anlan set up a perimeter around Taungoo. The Japanese 55th Division bombards the positions on the west bank of the Sittaung River with artillery. The Japanese 56th Division links up with the 55th and crosses the river. Taungoo is surrounded and finally taken, while the remnants of the Chinese 200th Division withdraws to new defensive positions at Yedashe.
 March 20 – WWII: After being forced to flee the Philippines, U.S. General Douglas MacArthur announces (in Terowie, South Australia), "I came through and I shall return."
 March 22 – WWII: Second Battle of Sirte: Escorting warships of a British convoy to Malta ward off a much more powerful Regia Marina (Italian Navy) squadron, north of the Gulf of Sirte.
 March 23 – WWII: The Germans burn down the Ukrainian village of Yelino (Koriukivka Raion), killing 296 civilians.
 March 24 – The evacuation of Polish nationals from the Soviet Union begins. It is conducted in two phases: until April 5; and between August 10 and 30, 1942, by sea from Krasnovodsk to Pahlavi (Anzali), and (to a lesser extent) overland from Ashkabad to Mashhad. In all, 115,000 people are evacuated, 37,000 of them civilians, 18,000 children (7% of the number of Polish citizens originally exiled to the Soviet Union).
 March 25–26 – The Holocaust: First mass transport of Jews to Auschwitz concentration camp, 997 women and girls from Poprad transit camp in the Slovak Republic.
 March 28 – WWII:
 St Nazaire Raid (Operation Chariot) – British Commandos raid Saint-Nazaire on the coast of Western France, to put its dockyard facilities out of action.
 Bombing of Lübeck in World War II: St. Mary's Church, Lübeck is destroyed by an Allied bombing raid.
 March 29 – WWII: Following a coup d'état, the Free Republic of Nias is proclaimed by a group of freed Nazi German prisoners in the Indonesian island of Nias; the republic exists for less than a month until the island is fully occupied by Japanese troops.
 March 31 – WWII: Battle of Christmas Island – Japanese troops occupy Christmas Island without resistance, following a mutiny by British Indian Army troops against their British officers.

April

 April
 The Holocaust: the Nazi German extermination camp Sobibór opens in occupied Poland, on the outskirts of the town of Sobibór. Between April 1942 and October 1943, at least 160,000 people are killed here.
 77 Uzbek prisoners of war held at Amersfoort concentration camp in the occupied Netherlands are shot by Nazi German guards, 24 of their compatriots having previously died there as a result of forced starvation.
 April 3 – WWII: Japanese forces begin the last phase of the Battle of Bataan, an all-out assault on the United States and Filipino troops on the Bataan Peninsula.
 April 5 – WWII: Easter Sunday Raid – Aircraft of the Japanese Navy attack Colombo, Ceylon (Sri Lanka).
 April 9 – WWII:
 Battle of Bataan: The Bataan Peninsula falls, American and Filipino forces (some 75,000 soldiers) surrender to the Japanese 14th Army under General Masaharu Homma. 
 Bataan Death March: American and Filipino prisoners of war are forced to march to San Fernando to Capas (some 65 miles). During the march some 15,000 soldiers are killed by severe physical abuse and wanton killings. 
 The Japanese Navy launches an air raid on Trincomalee in Ceylon (Sri Lanka); the Royal Navy aircraft carrier  and Royal Australian Navy destroyer  are sunk off the country's East Coast.
 April 10 – The Holocaust: Construction of the Nazi German extermination camp Treblinka II commences in occupied Poland near the village of Treblinka. Between July 23, 1942, and October 1943, around 850,000 people are killed here, more than 800,000 of whom are Jews.
 April 13 – WWII: Japanese forces of the 56th Division under General Masao Watanabe cross the Sittang River and defeat the Chinese 6th Corps in the Karen Hills area battles of Mawchi.
 The United States Federal Communications Commission's minimum programming time required of television stations is cut from 15 hours to 4 hours a week during the war.
 April 14 
 WWII: British submarine  is probably sunk by Axis forces in the Mediterranean.
 April 15 – WWII: Award of the George Cross to Malta: King George VI awards the George Cross to the island of Malta to mark the Siege of Malta, saying, "To honor her brave people I award the George Cross to the Island Fortress of Malta, to bear witness to a heroism and a devotion that will long be famous in history" (from January 1 to July 24, there is only one 24-hour period during which no bombs fall on this tiny island).
 April 17 – WWII: Henri Giraud, French general captured in 1940, escapes from Königstein Fortress near Dresden. He lowers himself down the cliffside fortress with a 50-meter 'rope' he made with odds and ends smuggled in to him. After traveling for three days, Giraud safely reaches the Swiss border.
 April 18 – WWII: Doolittle Raid: Lieutenant Colonel James "Jimmy" Doolittle leads a bombing mission against Japan, along with 79 airmen of the US. Air force, flying 16 B-25 Mitchell land-based bombers. They take off from the USS Hornet in the Pacific Ocean, some 700 miles (1,126 km) east of Tokyo. Thirteen of the B-25 bombers fly over Tokyo and drop their bombs on oil storage facilities, factories and military targets. The other three B-25s drop their bombs over Yokohama, Nagoya and Kobe. All but one of the B-25s ran out of fuel before reaching friendly forces in western China and is forced to land in Japanese-occupied China. With the support of Chinese farmers, 71 airmen reach free China. Eight airmen are captured by the Japanese – who execute four of them in retaliation for the raid.
 April 20 – WWII: Operation Calendar: The American aircraft carrier USS Wasp, escorted by the British battlecruiser HMS Renown, two cruisers and six destroyers, brings 47 planes (Spitfires) to Malta. They are successfully delivered – but 30 of them are immediately destroyed on the ground by German bombers. Within 48 hours all planes are destroyed.
 April 23
 WWII: Exeter becomes the first historic English city bombed as part of the Baedeker Blitz, in retaliation for the British bombing of Lübeck.
 Exeter-born William Temple is enthroned as Archbishop of Canterbury.
 April 25 – Princess Elizabeth registers for war service in the U.K.
 April 26
 WWII: The Reichstag meets for the last time, dissolving itself and proclaiming Adolf Hitler the "Supreme Judge of the German People", granting him the power of life and death over every German citizen.
 A gas and coal dust explosion at Benxihu Colliery in Manchukuo kills as many as 1,549 workers, the world's all-time worst mining disaster.
 April 27 
 WWII: A national plebiscite is held in Canada on the issue of conscription.
 The Jewish Star of David is required wearing for all Jews in the Netherlands and Belgium; Jews in other Nazi-controlled countries have already been wearing it.
 April 29 – WWII: 
 Burma campaign: Japanese forces of the 15 Army under General Shōjirō Iida capture Lashio. The allies are in full retreat.
 An explosion at a chemical factory in Tessenderlo, Belgium leaves 200 dead and 1,000 injured.

May

 May – Operation Pluto: The plan to construct oil pipelines under the English Channel, between England and France, is tested in the River Medway.
 May 3–4 – WWII: Tulagi is invaded by Japanese forces in the British Solomon Islands of the South Pacific, as part of Operation Mo.
 May 5 – WWII: Battle of Madagascar (Operation Ironclad) begins when British forces land on the Vichy French colony of Madagascar. On May 7 the northern city of Diego Suarez surrenders.
 May 7 – WWII: On Corregidor, the last American and Filipino forces in the Philippines under command of 2LT Robert L. Obourn (92nd Coast Artillery Regiment, G Battery) from Fort Mills, surrender to the Japanese as directed by Lt. Gen. Jonathan M. Wainwright, the overall commander.
 May 8 – WWII:
 The Battle of the Kerch Peninsula: The German 11th Army begins Operation Trappenjagd (Bustard Hunt) and destroys the bridgehead of the three Soviet Armies (44th, 47th, and 51st) defending the Kerch Peninsula, in the eastern part of the Crimea. 
 The Battle of the Coral Sea (first battle in naval history where 2 enemy fleets fight without seeing each other's fleets) ends in an Allied victory.
 The Battle of the Kerch Peninsula: German and Romanian forces launch Unternehmen Trappenjagd (Operation Bustard Hunt), aiming at defeating the Soviet Crimean Front defending the Kerch Peninsula. The battle ends in an Axis victory. 
 May 8–9 – WWII: At night, gunners of the Ceylon Garrison Artillery on Horsburgh Island in the Cocos Islands revolt. The mutiny is crushed, and 3 soldiers are executed (the only British Commonwealth soldiers to be executed for mutiny).
 May 9 – WWII: Operation Bowery: The USS Wasp and HMS Eagle bring 61 Spitfires to Malta ("Club Runs"). The fighter aircraft are desperately needed to bolster the island's defense against German Luftwaffe air raids.
 May 12 – WWII:
 Second Battle of Kharkiv: In the eastern Ukraine, the Soviet Army initiates a major offensive to capture the city of Kharkov from the German Army, only to be encircled and destroyed.
 Japanese minelayer Okinoshima is sunk by American submarine .
 May 15 – WWII: In the United States, a bill creating the Women's Auxiliary Army Corps (WAAC) is signed into law.
 May 20 – The first African-American seamen are taken into the United States Navy.
 May 23 – WWII: German forces of the 6th Army under General Friedrich Paulus and the 1st Panzer Army led by General Ewald von Kleist meet up at Balakleya, southeast of Kharkov, and encircle most of the Soviet 6th and 9th armies, capturing a 250,000-strong Soviet force inside the pocket.
 May 26 – WWII:
 Battle of Gazala: German forces of Panzer Army Africa led by General Erwin Rommel launch a frontal attack on the central Gazala positions. During the day, the bulk of Rommel's forces move forward, giving the British the impression that this is the main Axis assault. When night falls, the armoured formations turn south in a sweeping move around the southern end of the Gazala line.
 Battle of Bir Hakeim: The Free French and British troops slow the German advance in North Africa.
 The Anglo-Soviet Treaty of 1942, to help establish a military and political alliance between the USSR and the British Empire, is signed in London by foreign Secretary Anthony Eden and Soviet foreign minister Vyacheslav Molotov.
 May 27 – WWII: Operation Anthropoid: Czech paratroopers attempt to assassinate Reinhard Heydrich in Prague, and succeed in wounding him.
 May 29 – Thai spelling reform of 1942 is initiated by the government of Prime Minister Field Marshal Plaek Phibunsongkhram with his office announcing a simplification of the Thai alphabet. The announcement is published in the Royal Gazette on June 1. The reform is canceled by the government of Khuang Aphaiwong on August 2, 1944.
 May 30–31 – WWII: Bombing of Cologne – British RAF Bomber Command's "Operation Millennium", its first "1,000 bomber raid", with associated fires make 13,000 families homeless and kills around 475 people, mostly civilians; 3,330 non-residential buildings are destroyed.
 May 31–June 1 – WWII: Attack on Sydney Harbour: Japanese midget submarines infiltrate Sydney Harbour in Australia, in an attempt to attack Allied warships.

June

 June 1 – WWII:
 Mexico declares war on Germany, Italy, and Japan.
 The Grand Coulee Dam is finished on the Columbia River.
 June 4 – WWII: Reinhard Heydrich succumbs to wounds sustained on May 27, from Czechoslovakian paratroopers acting in Operation Anthropoid.
 June 4–June 7 – WWII: Battle of Midway: The Japanese naval advance in the Pacific is halted.
 June 5 – WWII: The United States declares war on Bulgaria, Hungary, and Romania.
 June 7 – WWII: 
 Siege of Sevastopol: German forces of the 11th Army under General Erich von Manstein begin renowned infantry attacks against the fortress city of Sevastopol. The Germans advance cautiously behind air and artillery support. Manstein had enough firepower to destroy the Soviet fortifications, he has some 1,300 guns and Heavy Artillery Battalion 833 (including a Karl-Batterie with three howitzers of 54 cm nicknamed "Thor", "Odin" and "Loki"). Firing in support, the German 80 cm Schwerer Gustav railway gun fires seven shells.
 Japanese forces invade the Aleutian Islands (the first invasion of American soil in 128 years).
 June 8 – WWII: Attack on Sydney Harbour: The Australian cities of Sydney and Newcastle are shelled by Japanese submarines. The eastern suburbs of both cities are damaged, and the east coast is blacked out.
 June 9 – WWII: Nazis burn the Czech village of Lidice, in reprisal for the killing of Reinhard Heydrich.
 June 10 – WWII: 
 Free French forces (some 2,700 men) evacuate Bir Hakeim and escape through a minefield, where they are picked up by British patrols of the 7th Armoured Division.
 Lidice massacre: The Gestapo massacres 173 male residents of Lidice, Czechoslovakia, in retaliation for the killing of Reinhard Heydrich.
 June 11 – WWII: German forces of the 15th Panzer Division together with the 90th Light Division reach El Adem. Panzer Army Africa captures the area around El Adem, and the 29th Indian Brigade, which has defended El Adem is almost wiped out by the Germans. 
 June 12 – WWII: The Holocaust: On her 13th birthday, Anna Frank makes the first entry in her new diary.
 June 12–15 – WWII: Operation Harpoon: A Allied convoy under Admiral Alban Curteis leaves from Gibraltar with 6 merchant ships escorted by the British battleship HMS Malaya, aircraft carriers HMS Argus and HMS Eagle, 4 cruisers and 17 destroyers to Malta. Two of the six merchant ships completes the journey, at the cost of several Allied warships.
 June 13 – WWII: 
 German forces of the 21st Panzer Division advance from the west and attack the British tanks of the 22nd Armoured Brigade. Erwin Rommel demonstrates superiority in tactics, compressing the British armoured forces between two Panzer Divisions of the Panzer Army Africa and the Italian Ariete and Trieste Divisions. By the end of the day, the British tank strength is reduced from 300 tanks to about 70. Rommel establishes armour superiority and surrounds the "Knightsbridge" positions. Due to the many losses, this defeat becomes known as "Black Saturday" to the Eighth Army.
 German scientists under Ernst Steinhoff at Peenemünde Army Research Center tests a 12-ton rocket (known later as the V-2 rocket) with a one-ton warhead.
 The United States opens its Office of War Information, a propaganda center.
 June 14 – WWII: The British Eighth Army under General Neil Ritchie is forced with two divisions to withdraw from the Gazala Line. The defenders of El-Adem and two neighbouring boxes hold out against the Germans. The South African 1st Division retreats along the coast road, practically intact. General Claude Auchinleck orders Ritchie to hold the line south-east from Acroma (west of Tobruk) through El-Adem to Bir El Gubi.
 June 15 – WWII: Erwin Rommel sends German forces from the 21st Panzer Division and 90th Light Division to attack the defensive boxes at El-Adem and Sidi Rezegh. In the evening, Point 650 box at El-Adem is overrun. 
 June 17–21 – WWII: Siege of Tobruk: German forces of Panzer Army Africa led by Erwin Rommel attack Tobruk with massed air support. On June 21, they penetrate a weak spot on the eastern defensive perimeter, capturing the port and 33,000 prisoners. 
 June 18 – WWII: The SS surrounds the church where Jan Kubiš and Jozef Gabčík, the assassins of Reinhard Heydrich, are hiding. Kubiš is fatally wounded in the ensuing shootout, and Gabčík commits suicide to avoid capture.
 June 21 – WWII: The Japanese submarine I-25 surfaces off the US Pacific Coast and bombards Fort Stevens at the mouth of the Columbia River. The fort itself is not damaged, though a nearby baseball field is destroyed.
 June 23 – WWII:
 Erwin Rommel arrives in Bardia and gives the 90th Light Division orders to attack eastwards. The British 8th Army withdraws to Mersa Matruh, where the Indian 10th Division, elements of the Indian 5th Division and the British 50th Division takes up positions. 
 The experimental early-type nuclear reactor L-IV has an accident, becoming the first nuclear accident in history and consisting of a steam explosion and reactor fire in Leipzig.
 June 26–29 – WWII: Battle of Mersa Matruh: German forces of the Panzer Army Africa under Erwin Rommel pursues the Eighth Army as it retreats into Egypt. On June 28, the fortress port of Mersa Matruh and more than 6,000 prisoners are captured, along with plenty of supplies and equipment.
 June 27 – WWII: Allied Convoy PQ 17 sails from Iceland, with 35 merchant ships and 3 passenger ships that have been refitted for rescuing the crews of torpedoed ships. There's also one tanker, 6 destroyers and 13 smaller ships for close escort. The convoy is destined for the Soviet port of Archangelsk.
 June 28 – WWII: Operation Blue: German forces of Army Group South under Generalfeldmarshall Fedor von Bock drive to Stalingrad and the Baku oil fields. Spearheads of the 4th Panzer Army under General Hermann Hoth drive towards Voronezh, advancing nearly 50 km on day one. They crossed two rivers and cut the link one between the Soviet 13th and 40th armies.
 June 30 – WWII: 
 German forces of the 11th Army under General Erich von Manstein take Sevastopol, although fighting rages until July 4. The city is evacuated by the Soviets, some 90,000 prisoners are taken and von Manstein is promoted to Field Marshal.
 German forces of Panzer Army Africa under Erwin Rommel approach the Alamein positions, only 106 km from Alexandria. The Axis forces are exhausted and Rommel has supply problems, because the RAF attacks his supply lines.

July

 July – The Holocaust: Inmates of Westerbork transit camp in the occupied Netherlands begin to be shipped to Nazi extermination camps. From now until 1944 around 107,000, mostly Jewish, from here will be killed.
 July 1–27 – WWII: First Battle of El Alamein: British forces prevent a second advance by Axis forces into Egypt. The 15th and 21st Panzer Divisions are halted and Erwin Rommel orders his forces to regroup. The panzer strength of the German Afrika Korps has been reduced to only 26 vehicles.
 July 3 – WWII: Guadalcanal, occupied only by aborigines, falls to the Japanese Naval construction force deployed to construct an airfield on the island.
 July 4 – WWII in the European Theater of Operations:
 Twenty-four ships are sunk by German bombers and submarines after Convoy PQ 17 to the Soviet Union is scattered in the Arctic Ocean to evade the German battleship Tirpitz.
 The United States Eighth Air Force inauspiciously flies its first mission in Europe, using borrowed British planes, and bombs targets in the Netherlands, such as De Kooy Airfield, attached to the Den Helder Naval Base. Three of six aircraft return; For this mission, Captain Charles C. Kegelman is the first member of the Force to be awarded the U.S. Distinguished Flying Cross.
 July 5 – German forces of the 4th Panzer Army under General Hermann Hoth reach the Don River near Voronezh and become embroiled in the battle to capture the city.
 July 6 – The Holocaust: Anne Frank's family goes into hiding in an attic above her father's office in an Amsterdam warehouse.
 July 7 – German forces of the 4th Panzer Army reach the outskirts of Voronezh, but the Soviet army mounts a successful counterattack that ties up Hoth's forces for days.
 July 8 – Turkish prime minister Refik Saydam dies while working in the office. For one day he is succeeded by Ahmet Fikri Tüzer.
July 9 – Şükrü Saracoğlu forms the new (13th) government in Turkey.
 July 13 – WWII: U-boats sink three merchant ships in the Gulf of St. Lawrence.
 July 14 – WWII:
 Bastille Day Gaullist demonstrations in Vichy France; 2 women are shot dead by members of the fascist French Popular Party (PPF) in Marseille.
 Germany introduces the Ostvolk Medal for Soviet personnel in the Wehrmacht.
 July 16
 The Holocaust: By order of the Vichy France government headed by Pierre Laval, French police officers round-up 13,000–20,000 Jews and imprison them in the Winter Velodrome.
 Georges Bégué and others escape from the Mauzac prison camp.
 July 18 – WWII: The Germans test fly the Messerschmitt Me 262 (using only its jet engines) for the first time.
 July 19 – WWII: Battle of the Atlantic: German Grand Admiral Karl Dönitz orders the last U-boats to withdraw from there the United States Atlantic coast positions, in response to an effective American convoy system.
 July 21 – WWII: The Japanese establish a beachhead on the north coast of New Guinea in the Buna-Gona area; a small Australian force begins a rearguard action on the Kokoda Track campaign.
 July 22 – WWII: The Holocaust: The systematic deportation of Jews from the Warsaw Ghetto begins.
 July 23 – WWII:
 Adolf Hitler issues Directive 45, ordering the seizure of the Black Sea coast down to Batum, and taking the oilfields of Maikop, Grozny and Baku.
 The Holocaust: The gas chambers at Treblinka extermination camp begin operation, killing 6,500 Jews newly arrived from the Warsaw Ghetto.
 July 25 – WWII: Battle of Kalach: German forces of the 6th Army under General Friedrich Paulus attack the Stalingrad Front and manages to surround part of the Soviet 62nd and 64th armies in the Kalach Pocket.
 July 29 – The Presidium of the Supreme Soviet of the Soviet Union institutes the Order of Suvorov and Order of Kutuzov and reinstates the Order of Alexander Nevsky.
 July 30 – WWII:
 WAVES (Women Accepted for Volunteer Emergency Service), the United States Naval Reserve (Women's Reserve), is signed into law.
 July 31 – The Oxford Committee for Famine Relief (Oxfam) is founded in England.

August 

 August 3–15 – WWII: Operation Pedestal: A British convoy of 14 merchant ships with a massive escort of two battleships, 4 aircraft carriers, 7 cruisers, 32 destroyers and smaller ships commanded by Admiral Edward Neville Syfret, sets sail to Malta under relentless attacks by day and night from enemy submarines, aircraft and Axis surface forces. The 55,000 tons of food and fuel delivery by this convoy saves Malta from surrender and allows Malta-based aircraft and submarines to resume their attacks against Rommel's supply lines.
 August 4 – WWII: Operation Letica: An assassination attempt on Serbian fascist Minister of Finance Dušan Letica, by a group Yugoslav Resistance fighters, fails.
 August 5 – WWII: German forces of the 4th Panzer Army under General Hermann Hoth resume their advance and reach Abganerovo, 70 km southwest of Stalingrad. They are stopped by the Soviet 64th Army under General Vasily Chuikov, who defend the southern approach to Stalingrad.
August 7 – WWII: Guadalcanal Campaign – The U.S. Navy and the U.S. Marine Corps start the first American offensive of the war, with an amphibious landing on the island of Guadalcanal in the Solomon Islands.
 August 8
 WWII: Battle of Savo Island: The Japanese Imperial Navy under Admiral Gunichi Mikawa wins a spectacular victory over the US Navy and the Australian Navy at Savo Island. Five cruisers and one destroyer are sunk, Mikawa's decision to withdraw under cover of the night rather than attempt to destroy the Allied invasion transports is primarily because of a possible Allied carrier strike against his fleet.  
 WWII: Allied North Atlantic convoy SC 94 loses 10 ships, as the first to be heavily attacked by U-boats resuming mid-Atlantic wolf pack attacks, through the climactic winter of 1942–43.
 WWII: In Washington, D.C., six German saboteurs are executed for their role in the failed mission Operation Pastorius (2 others are cooperative and receive sentences of life imprisonment instead, being freed a few years after the end of the war).
 August 9
 Indian leader Mohandas Gandhi is arrested in Bombay, by British forces.
 Start, led by the goalkeeper Nikolai Trusevich, play football against the German Luftwaffe team Flakelf in Nazi-occupied Kyiv. Against all odds, they win 5–3. Eight of them are later arrested and tortured, and at least four are killed.
 Leningrad première of Shostakovich's Symphony No. 7, with the city still under siege.
 August 11 – Hedy Lamarr's and her friend George Antheil's frequency-hopping system for radio-controlled torpedoes is granted a patent under . In 1962 (at the time of the Cuban missile crisis), an updated version of their design will at last appear on Navy ships.
 August 13 – A Quit India resolution is passed by the Bombay session of the All India Congress Committee (AICC), which leads to the start of a historical civil disobedience movement across India.
 August 15 – WWII: American tanker  reaches Malta, as part of the convoy of Operation Pedestal.
 August 16
 Polish-Jewish teacher Janusz Korczak follows a group of Jewish children into the Treblinka extermination camp.
 U.S. Navy blimp L-8 (Flight 101) comes ashore near San Francisco, eventually coming down in Daly City (the crew is missing).
 August 17 
 WWII: Raid on Makin Island: US Marines of the 2nd Raider Battalion (211 men) under Lt. Col. Evans Carlson embark aboard the submarines Argonaut and Nautilus at Pearl Harbor. The aim is to destroy the Japanese installations and gather intelligence. Only the first of these objectives is achieved, but the raid does boost morale and provide a test for Raider tactics.
 WWII: Heavy bombers of the U.S. Eighth Air Force, based in England, conduct their first raid against occupied France.
 August 19 – WWII: Dieppe Raid: An Allied amphibious attack on the German-occupied port of Dieppe in northern France is repulsed. Some 6,000 men of the Canadian 2nd Infantry Division under General John Roberts, supported by 3 and 4 Commando, 50 or so US Rangers and Free French Commandos, are put ashore. The raid is designed to provide battle experience for the troops and to gain information about German defense methods. The casualties are some 3,600 men, 1 destroyer, 30 tanks and 33 landing craft.
 August 20 – Plutonium is isolated for the first time, at the Metallurgical Laboratory of the University of Chicago.
 August 21 
 WWII: Operation Edelweiss: German forces (Gebirgsjäger) of the 1st Mountain Division place the Nazi swastika flag on the summit of Mount Elbrus, a prominent peak of the Caucasus at 5.629 meters.
 WWII: Battle of the Tenaru: The Americans defeat Japanese land forces on Guadalcanal.
 August 22 – WWII: Brazil declares war on Germany and Italy.
 August 23 – WWII: Battle of Stalingrad: German forces of the 16th Panzer Division reach the suburbs of Stalingrad. The German 6th Army under General Friedrich Paulus stabilishes the frontier and takes up positions at the Volga River.
 August 24
 WWII: Charge of the Savoia Cavalleria at Izbushensky: An Italian cavalry regiment attacks Soviet forces with drawn sabers at Izbushensky, Russia, one of the last major cavalry charges.
 WWII: Allied North Atlantic convoy ON 122 is attacked by U-boats, which sink 4 ships.
 WWII: The 2-day Battle of the Eastern Solomons begins: Bombers from carrier USS Saratoga sink Japanese aircraft carrier Ryūjō near Santa Isabel Island, helping to lead to an Allied victory.
 August 25
 WWII: Battle of Milne Bay opens, when Japanese marines land at Milne Bay.
 Dunbeath air crash: Prince George, Duke of Kent, brother to King George VI and King Edward VIII, is among 14 to die in a military aircraft accident at Morven, Scotland, at the age of 39.
 August 26–31 – WWII: Battle of Isurava: Japanese forces (some 2,100 men) of the South Seas Detachment under General Tomitarō Horii defeat the Australian Maroubra Force at Isurava, who fights delaying actions on the Kokoda Track.
 August 27–28 – Sarny Massacre: Nazi troops and the Ukrainian Auxiliary Police systematically execute more than 14,000 people, mostly Jews, in and around Sarny in German-occupied Poland.
 August 28 – Polish writer Zofia Kossak-Szczucka, as head of the underground organization Front for the Rebirth of Poland, publishes in Warsaw her Protest! against the mass murder of Jews in German-occupied Poland.
 August 29 – WWII: Tokyo Express: The Japanese navy starts at night to deliver reinforcements, supplies and equipment to the Japanese forces operating in and around New Guinea and the Solomon Islands.
 August 30 – WWII: Luxembourg is formally annexed to the German Reich.
 August 30–September 5 – WWII: Battle of Alam el Halfa – British forces in the Western Desert resist a German attack under Erwin Rommel. German tanks get slow down in the minefields around Alam el Halfa Ridge and are forced to withdraw.
 August 31 – The 1942 Luxembourgish general strike is launched, to protest against forced conscription in Luxembourg.

September

 September 2 – WWII: The island of Les Casquets in the Channel Islands is raided by the forerunner of the British SAS, the SSRF, led by Major Gus March-Phillipps; this is one of the first raids by Anders Lassen VC. In the raid, the entire garrison of 7 is abducted and returned to England as prisoners, and the radio and lighthouse are wrecked.
 September 3
 WWII: Erwin Rommel orders a general retreat and carries the German forces of Panzer Army Africa back to the line running from Tel el Eisa – Deir el Shein - west of Deir el Munassib down to the Qattara Depression. Allied forces of the 2nd New Zealand Division and the British 7th Armoured Division (Desert Rats) begin an assault, but they are repelled in a fierce rearguard action by the German 90th Light Division. During the attack, Rommel loses some 2,900 men, 50 tanks, a similar number of guns, and 400 vehicles.
 The Holocaust: A German attempt to liquidate the Jewish Łachwa Ghetto in occupied Poland leads to an uprising, probably the first ghetto uprising of the war.
 September 5
 WWII: Battle of Milne Bay: Japanese forces suffer their first defeat on land.
 The Holocaust: The Jews of Wolbrom in occupied Poland are rounded up by the Germans and their Ukrainian collaborators.
 September 9 – WWII: A Japanese floatplane drops incendiary devices at Mount Emily, near Brookings, Oregon, in the first of two "Lookout Air Raids", the first bombing of the continental United States.
 September 10
 WWII: North Atlantic convoy ON 127 is attacked by U-boats, sinking 6 ships.
 The Women's Auxiliary Ferrying Squadron (WAFS) begins operation in the United States.
 September 12 – WWII: The , carrying civilians, Allied soldiers, and Italian prisoners of war, is torpedoed off the coast of West Africa and sinks, killing 1,649 people.
 September 14–16 – WWII: Battle of Ioribaiwa: Australian forces (some 3,000 men) under Major-General Selwyn Porter are forced to withdraw to Imita Ridge, due to supply problems. 
 September 15 – WWII: The Women's Flying Training Detachment (WFTD) is established in the United States.
 September 24 – WWII: Andrée Borrel and Lise de Baissac become the first female SOE agents to be parachuted into occupied France.
 September 26 – The Holocaust: Nazi official August Frank issues the August Frank memorandum, setting out how the belongings of "evacuated" (i.e. murdered) Jews are to be disposed of.
 September 27 – WWII: Both the commerce raiding German auxiliary cruiser Stier and American Liberty ship  sink, following a gun battle in the South Atlantic. Hilfskreuzer Stier is the only commerce raider to be sunk by a defensively equipped merchant ship.

October

 October 2
 British cruiser  collides with liner  (carrying troops from the United States) off the coast of Donegal and sinks; 338 drown.
 The first American-built turbojet aircraft, the Bell P-59 Airacomet fighter prototype, makes its first official flight.
 October 3 – The first A-4 rocket is successfully launched from Test Stand VII at Peenemünde, Germany. The rocket flies 147 kilometers and reaches an altitude of 84.5 kilometers, becoming the first man-made object to reach space.
 October 9
 WWII: Third Battle of the Matanikau on Guadalcanal: American forces defeat the Japanese.
 The Statute of Westminster Adoption Act, passed by the Parliament of Australia, formalizes Australian autonomy from the United Kingdom.
 October 11 – WWII: Battle of Cape Esperance: On the northwest coast of Guadalcanal, United States Navy ships intercept and defeat a Japanese fleet, on their way to reinforce troops on the island.
 October 13 – WWII: North Atlantic convoy SC 104 is attacked by U-boats, sinking seven ships.
 October 14
 The Holocaust: The International Committee of the Red Cross, meeting in special session at the Hotel Métropole, Geneva, Switzerland, declines to issue an international appeal condemning the holding of civilians in Nazi concentration camps.
 October 16
 A cyclone and consequential floods in the Bay of Bengal kill 40,000 people, with particularly heavy damage around Contai.
 Animated short film The Mouse of Tomorrow, featuring the debut of Mighty Mouse (as "Super Mouse"), is released in the United States.
 October 18 – WWII: Hitler issues the Commando Order, which stipulates that all Allied commandos encountered by German forces should be executed immediately without trial, even in proper uniforms, in response to the Dieppe Raid and Operation Basalt conducted by the Allies. After the war, the Nuremberg trials finds this order a direct violation of the laws and customs of war.
 October 21 – A Royal New Zealand Air Force torpedo bomber sinks the German MS Palatia, with a loss of 946 lives.
 October 23 – Award-winning composer and songwriter Ralph Rainger ("Thanks for the Memory") is among 12 people killed in a mid-air collision between an American Airlines DC-3 and a U.S. Army bomber near Palm Springs, California.
 October 23–26 – WWII: Battle for Henderson Field: Japanese forces fail to recapture Henderson Field airfield in Guadalcanal from the Americans.
 October 23–November 4 – WWII: Second Battle of El Alamein: British troops go on the offensive against the Axis forces.
 October 26 – WWII: Battle of the Santa Cruz Islands: Two Japanese aircraft carriers are heavily damaged and one U.S. Navy carrier is sunk.
 October 28 
 Film actor Errol Flynn is accused of statutory rape by two teenage girls. 
 The Alaska Highway is completed.
 October 29 – The Holocaust: In the United Kingdom, leading clergymen and political figures hold a public meeting to register outrage over Nazi Germany's persecution of Jews.
 October 30 – WWII:
 U-boats sink 11 ships, attacking diversionary convoy SL 125, but move out of the path of approaching troopships, carrying Allied Operation Torch invasion forces.
 British sailors board  as it sinks in the Mediterranean and retrieves its Enigma machine and codebooks.

November

 November 1 – WWII: North Atlantic convoy SC 107 is heavily attacked by U-boats, sinking 15 ships.
 November 2 – A USAAF squadron, including B-24 Liberators, intercepts many Luftwaffe patrols off the coast of Oran, Algeria.
 November 3 – WWII: Second Battle of El Alamein: German forces under Erwin Rommel are forced to retreat during the night.
 November 6 – WWII: Battle of Madagascar ends when Vichy French forces on Madagascar sign an armistice with the Allies.
 November 8 – WWII:
 Operation Torch: Elements of the Allied expeditionary force (some 105,000 men) under Lieutenant General Dwight D. Eisenhower lands simultaneously along the coastline of Morocco and Algeria in French North Africa.
 French Resistance Coup in Algiers: 400 French civil resisters neutralize the Vichyist XIXth Army Corps and the Vichyist generals (Juin, Darlan, etc.), thus allowing the immediate success of Operation Torch in Algiers, and ultimately the whole of French North Africa.
 November 9 – WWII: 
 German forces of the 6th Army under general Friedrich Paulus reach finally the river bank of the Volga, capturing 90% of the ruined city of Stalingrad and splitting the remaining Soviet forces into two narrow pockets.
 U.S. serviceman Edward Leonski is hanged at Melbourne's Pentridge Prison, for the "Brown-Out" murders of three women in May.
 November 10 – WWII: In violation of a 1940 armistice, Germany invades Vichy France, following French Admiral François Darlan's agreement to an armistice with the Allies in North Africa.
 November 12 – WWII: Guadalcanal Campaign: A naval battle near Guadalcanal starts between Japanese and American forces.
 November 13 – WWII:
 Guadalcanal Campaign: Aviators from the  sink the Japanese battleship Hiei.
 British forces capture Tobruk.
 November 15 – WWII:
 The Naval Battle of Guadalcanal ends: Although the United States Navy suffers heavy losses, it retains control of Guadalcanal.
 British forces capture Derna, Libya.
 November 18 – WWII: North Atlantic convoy ON 144 is attacked by U-boats, sinking 5 ships.
 November 19 – WWII: Battle of Stalingrad: Soviet Union forces under General Georgy Zhukov launch the Operation Uranus counter-attacks at Stalingrad, turning the tide of the battle in the USSR's favor.
 November 20 – WWII: British forces capture Benghazi.
 November 21 – The completion of the Alaska Highway (also known as the Alcan Highway) is celebrated (however, the "highway" is not usable by general vehicles until 1943).
 November 22 – WWII: Battle of Stalingrad: The situation for the German attackers of Stalingrad seems desperate during the Soviet counter-attack Operation Uranus, and General Friedrich Paulus sends Adolf Hitler a telegram, saying that the German Sixth Army is surrounded.
 November 23 – WWII
One crewman, Chinese second steward Poon Lim, is separated from the others and spends 130 days adrift, until he is rescued on April 3, 1943.
 Legislation approves the United States Coast Guard Women's Reserve, to help fill jobs and free men to serve during the war effort. They are known as the SPARS ("Semper Paratus, Always Ready!")
 November 25–26 – WWII: Operation Harling: A British Special Operations Executive team, together with Greek Resistance fighters, blows up the Gorgopotamos viaduct, in the first major sabotage act in occupied continental Europe.
 November 26 – The movie Casablanca premières at the Hollywood Theater in New York City.
 November 27 – WWII: At Toulon, the French navy scuttles its ships and submarines, to keep them out of Nazi hands.
 November 28
 Cocoanut Grove fire: A fire in the Cocoanut Grove night club in Boston, Massachusetts, kills 491.
 The large-scale German "pacification" of the Zamojszczyzna region of Poland begins.
 November 29 – The Blue Star Line cargo liner  runs aground on the Skeleton Coast of Namibia. Crew and passengers survive, following a 26-day overland trek to Windhoek.
 November 30 – WWII: Battle of Tassafaronga – In a nighttime naval battle as part of the Guadalcanal Campaign, ships of the Imperial Japanese Navy defeat those of the United States Navy.

December

 December 1 – Gasoline rationing begins in the United States.
 December 2 – Manhattan Project: Below the bleachers of Stagg Field at the University of Chicago, a team led by Enrico Fermi initiates the first self-sustaining nuclear chain reaction (a coded message, "The Italian navigator has landed in the new world" is then sent to U.S. President Franklin D. Roosevelt).
 December 4
 The Holocaust: In Warsaw, two women, Zofia Kossak and Wanda Filipowicz, risk their lives by setting up the Council for the Assistance of the Jews.
 WWII: USAAF bombers make their first raid on Italy.
 December 6 – Stary Ciepielów and Rekówka massacre: 5 families in Occupied Poland are executed by the Ordnungspolizei as part of the German retribution against Poles who helped Jews.
 December 7 – WWII: 
British commandos conduct Operation Frankton, a raid on shipping in Bordeaux Harbour.
The battleship  is launched at Philadelphia, Pennsylvania.
 December 8 – A fire at Seacliff Lunatic Asylum in New Zealand kills 39 patients.
 December 10 – The Holocaust: The Polish government-in-exile sends copies of The Mass Extermination of Jews in German Occupied Poland, including Raczyński's Note, the first official report on The Holocaust, to 26 governments who signed the Declaration by United Nations.
 December 11 – WWII: Operation Lilliput: The Allies start a convoy operation for transportation of troops, weapons, and supplies in a regular transport service between Milne Bay and Oro Bay in New Guinea. The first vessel to arrive at Oro Bay is Karsik, escorted by HMAS Lithgow, with four Stuart light tanks.
 December 12 – WWII: German troops began Operation Winter Storm, an attempt to relieve encircled Axis forces during the Battle of Stalingrad.
 December 15 – WWII: Guadalcanal Campaign – Battle of Mount Austen, the Galloping Horse, and the Sea Horse: the United States and allied forces begin to attack Japanese positions near the Matanikau River.
 December 17 – The Allies issue the Joint Declaration by Members of the United Nations (as the answer to Raczyński's Note), the first time they publicly acknowledge the Holocaust.
 December 20 – WWII: First Arakan Campaign: Allied forces begin a counter-offensive into Burma. During the offensive, Japanese defenders occupying well-prepared positions repeatedly repulse the British and Indian forces.
 December 22
 An avalanche in Aliquippa, Pennsylvania, kills 26, including Vulcan Crucible Steel heir-apparent Samuel A. Stafford Sr., when two 100 ton boulders fall on a bus filled with wartime steelworkers on their way home.
 An airplane carrying prominent Ustashe general Jure Francetić crashes. Francetić dies as a result of the injuries on December 27.
 December 24 – French Admiral Darlan, the former Vichy leader who has switched over to the Allies following the Torch landings, is assassinated in Algiers.
 December 27 – The Union of Pioneers of Yugoslavia is founded.
 December 28 – North Atlantic Convoy ON 154 is heavily attacked by U-boats, sinking 13 ships.
 December 31 - The Times Square Ball in Times Square, New York City isn't dropped for the first time. Instead, there is a moment of silence at midnight, followed by the sound of bells playing from sound trucks at the base of One Times Square.

Date unknown
 DDT is first used as a pesticide.
 circa JuneThe 1942 FIFA World Cup competition in Association football, which Nazi Germany sought to host, is not held, due to World War II.

Births

January

 January 1
 Adil Abdul-Mahdi, 49th Prime Minister of Iraq
 Alassane Ouattara, 5th President of the Ivory Coast
 Gennadi Sarafanov, Russian cosmonaut (d. 2005)
 January 3
 László Sólyom, President of Hungary
 John Thaw, English actor (d. 2002)
 January 4 
 Bolaji Akinyemi, Nigerian professor of political science
 Jaber Al-Mubarak Al-Hamad Al-Sabah, 7th Prime Minister of Kuwait
 Dame Marcela Contreras, Chilean-British immunologist and educator
 John McLaughlin, English guitarist, bandleader and composer
 January 5 
 Terenci Moix, Spanish writer (d. 2003)
 Maurizio Pollini, Italian pianist
 Charlie Rose, American television anchor and talk show host
 January 7 – Vasily Alekseyev, Soviet weightlifter (d. 2011)
 January 8
 Fauziyya Hassan, Maldivian actress (d. 2022)
 Stephen Hawking, British physicist (d. 2018)
 Junichiro Koizumi, 56th Prime Minister of Japan
 January 9 – Lee Kun-hee, South Korean businessman (d. 2020)
 January 10 – Walter Hill, American film director, screenwriter, and producer
 January 11 – Clarence Clemons, African-American saxophonist (d. 2011)
 January 12
 Ramiro de León Carpio, 31st President of Guatemala (d. 2002)
 Michel Mayor, Swiss astronomer, recipient of the Nobel Prize in Physics
 January 14 – Yogesh Kumar Sabharwal, Chief Justice of India (d. 2015)
 January 16 
 René Angélil, Canadian singer and manager (d. 2016)
 Richard Bohringer, French actor
 Nicole Fontaine, French politician (d. 2018)
Zhao Zhongxiang, Chinese television host (d. 2020)
 January 17
 Muhammad Ali, African-American boxer, activist, and philanthropist (d. 2016)
 Ita Buttrose, Australian journalist
 Antonio Fraguas de Pablo, Spanish graphic humorist (d. 2018)
 January 19 – Michael Crawford, English actor, singer and entertainer
 January 21 – Edwin Starr, singer (d. 2003)
 January 22
 Jaime Humberto Hermosillo, Mexican film director (d. 2020)
 Mimis Domazos, Greek footballer
 Amine Gemayel, 12th President of Lebanon
 January 23
 Punsalmaagiin Ochirbat, 1st President of Mongolia
 Salim Ahmed Salim, 4th Prime Minister of Tanzania
 January 25 – Eusébio, Mozambican Portuguese footballer (d. 2014)
 January 27 – Tasuku Honjo, Japanese immunologist, Nobel Prize laureate in Physiology or Medicine
 January 28 
 Hans Jürgen Bäumler, German figure skater, actor, pop singer and television host
 Sjoukje Dijkstra, Dutch figure skater
 Erkki Pohjanheimo, Finnish TV-producer and director
 January 29 – Arnaldo Tamayo Méndez, Cuban military officer, legislator, and cosmonaut 
 January 30 – Marty Balin, American singer, songwriter, and musician (d. 2018)
 January 31
 Daniela Bianchi, Italian actress
 Derek Jarman, English director and writer (d. 1994)

February

 February 1 
 Bibi Besch, Austrian-American actress (d. 1996)
 Terry Jones, Welsh actor (Monty Python) and writer (d. 2020)
 Masa Saito, Japanese professional wrestler (d. 2018)
 February 2 – Graham Nash, English rock musician
 February 7 – Bernard Lietaer, Belgian engineer and economist (d. 2019)
 February 8 – Gordon Morritt, English footballer (d. 2018)
 February 9
 Manuel Castells, Spanish sociologist
 Carole King, American singer and composer
 February 12 
 Ehud Barak, 10th Prime Minister of Israel
 Lionel Grigson, British jazz pianist, composer, writer, educator (d. 1994)
 February 13 
 Carol Lynley, American actress (d. 2019)
 Peter Tork, American musician and actor (d. 2019)
 Donald E. Williams, American astronaut (d. 2016)
 February 15 
 Sadou Hayatou, 4th Prime Minister of Cameroon (d. 2019)
 Sherry Jackson, American actress
 February 20 – Phil Esposito, Canadian hockey player
 February 21 – Margarethe von Trotta, German actress, film director and writer
 February 22 – Christine Keeler, English model (d. 2017)
 February 25 – Karen Grassle, American actress
 February 26 – Jozef Adamec, Slovak football player and manager (d. 2018)
 February 27 – Robert H. Grubbs, American chemist, Nobel Prize laureate (d. 2021)
 February 28 
 Brian Jones, English musician (d. 1969)
 Dino Zoff, Italian footballer and manager

March

 

 March 2
 John Irving, American author
 Lou Reed, American singer-songwriter and guitarist (d. 2013)
 March 5 
Felipe González, Prime Minister of Spain
Mike Resnick, American science fiction author (d. 2020)
 March 7
 Tammy Faye Bakker, American evangelist, singer and television personality (d. 2007)
 Michael Eisner, American film studio executive
 March 9 – John Cale, Welsh composer and musician
 March 12 – Ratko Mladić, former Bosnian Serb military leader
 March 13
 Dave Cutler, American software engineer
 Scatman John, American musician (d. 1999)
 March 15 – The Iron Sheik, Iranian-American wrestler 
 March 16 – James Soong, Taiwan politician
 March 17 – John Wayne Gacy, American serial killer (d. 1994)
 March 19 – José Serra, Brazilian politician
 March 23 
 Walter Rodney, Guyanese historian and political figure
 Michael Haneke, Austrian director and screenwriter
 March 24 – Jesús Alou, Dominican baseball player (d. 2023)
 March 25
 Aretha Franklin, American singer, songwriter, actress, and civil rights activist (d. 2018)
 Richard O'Brien, English-New Zealand actor
 March 26 – Erica Jong, American author
 March 26 – Edvard Schiffauer, Czech composer.
 March 27
 John E. Sulston, British chemist; recipient of the Nobel Prize in Physiology or Medicine (d. 2018)
 Michael York, English actor
 March 28
 Daniel Dennett, American philosopher
 Neil Kinnock, British Labour leader
 Mike Newell, British film director
 Conrad Schumann, East German border guard (d. 1998)
 Jerry Sloan, American basketball player and coach (d. 2020)
 March 29 
 Kenichi Ogata, Japanese voice actor
 Scott Wilson, American actor (d. 2018)
 March 30 – Ruben Kun, Nauruan politician and former President of Nauru

April

 April 1 – Samuel R. Delany, American science fiction author
 April 2
 Leon Russell, American singer, songwriter, pianist and guitarist (d. 2016)
 Roshan Seth, British actor
 April 3 
 Marsha Mason, American actress
 Wayne Newton, American entertainer and singer
 Billy Joe Royal, American singer (d. 2015)
 April 5
 Allan Clarke, English musician
 Peter Greenaway, English filmmaker and artist
 April 6 
 Barry Levinson, American film producer and director
 Anita Pallenberg, German-Italian actress, artist, and model (d. 2017)
 April 7 – Jeetendra, Indian actor
 April 8
 Roger Chapman, British rock singer 
 Douglas Trumbull, American film director and special effects artist (d. 2022)
 April 9 – Brandon deWilde, American actor (d. 1972) 
 April 10 – Hayedeh, Iranian singer (d. 1990)
 April 12 
 Carlos Reutemann, Argentine racing driver and politician (d. 2021)
 Jacob Zuma, 4th President of South Africa
 April 14
 Valeriy Brumel, Russian athlete (d. 2003)
 Valentin Lebedev, Russian cosmonaut
 April 15 – Julie Sommars, American actress
 April 17
 Kenas Aroi, Nauruan politician (d. 1991)
 David Bradley, English actor
 April 18
 Jeff Kimpel, American atmospheric scientist (d. 2020)
 Jochen Rindt, German-born racing driver (d. 1970)
 April 19 – Alan Price, English musician and keyboardist
 April 20
 Casimir Oyé-Mba, 3rd Prime Minister of Gabon (d. 2021)
 Arto Paasilinna, Finnish author (d. 2018)
 April 21 – Geoffrey Palmer, 33rd Prime Minister of New Zealand
 April 22 – Rudolf Jaenisch, German-American biologist 
 April 23
 Sandra Dee, American actress (d. 2005)
 Christian Frémont, French politician (d. 2014)
 April 24 – Barbra Streisand, American singer, actress, composer, and film director
 April 26 – Bobby Rydell, American singer (d. 2022)
 April 27
 Ruth Glick, American writer
 Jim Keltner, American drummer
 Valeri Polyakov, Russian cosmonaut (d. 2022)
 April 29 – Galina Kulakova, Soviet athlete

May

 May 1 – Jean Saubert, American alpine ski racer (d. 2007)
 May 2 – Jacques Rogge, 8th President of the International Olympic Committee (d. 2021)
 May 3 – Věra Čáslavská, Czech gymnast (d. 2016)
 May 5 
 Marc Alaimo, American actor
 Tammy Wynette, American country singer (d. 1998)
 May 6 – Ariel Dorfman, Argentine/Chilean novelist, playwright and essayist
 May 8
 Peter Corris, Australian academic, historian, journalist and a novelist (d. 2018) 
 Terry Neill, Northern Irish footballer and manager (d. 2022)
 May 9
 Tommy Roe, American singer-songwriter
 John Ashcroft, 79th United States Attorney General
May 12 – Ian Dury, British musician (d. 2000)
 May 13 – Vladimir Dzhanibekov, Soviet cosmonaut
 May 14
 Byron Dorgan, American author, businessman, attorney and politician
 Tony Pérez, Cuban-American professional baseball player and manager
 May 15
 Barnabas Sibusiso Dlamini, 2-Time Prime Minister of Swaziland (d. 2018)
 Anthony W. England, American astronaut
 Jusuf Kalla, 10th and 12th Vice President of Indonesia
 May 17 
 Philippe Gondet, French footballer (d. 2018)
 Taj Mahal, African-American singer and guitarist
 May 19 – Gary Kildall, American computer scientist and microcomputer entrepreneur (d. 1994)
 May 20 
 Lynn Davies, Welsh track and field athlete
 Carlos Hathcock, American Marine sniper (d. 1999)
 David Proval, American actor
 May 21 – Robert C. Springer, American astronaut and test pilot
 May 22
 Roger Brown, American basketball player (d. 1997)
 Ted Kaczynski, American domestic terrorist, mathematics professor, and anarchist author
 Barbara Parkins, Canadian actress
 May 24
 Ichirō Ozawa, Japanese politician
 Fraser Stoddart, Scottish-born scientist, recipient of the Nobel Prize in Chemistry
 May 25 – José Mário Branco, Portuguese singer-songwriter, actor, and record producer (d. 2019)
 May 28 – Stanley B. Prusiner, American scientist, recipient of the Nobel Prize in Physiology or Medicine
 May 29 – Kevin Conway, American actor and director (d. 2020)

June

 June 2
 Tony Buzan, English author and educational consultant (d. 2019)
 Eduard Malofeyev, Russian footballer and coach
 June 3 – Curtis Mayfield, African-American musician (d. 1999)
 June 5 – Teodoro Obiang Nguema Mbasogo, President of Equatorial Guinea and Chairperson of the African Union
 June 6 – Sandra Morgan, Australian swimmer
 June 7 
 Muammar Gaddafi, Libyan revolutionary, politician, and political theorist (d. 2011)
 Anneke Grönloh, Dutch singer (d. 2018)
 June 8 – Jacques Dubochet, Swiss biophysicist, recipient of the Nobel Prize in Chemistry
 June 10 – Preston Manning, Canadian politician
 June 12 – Bert Sakmann, German physiologist, recipient of the Nobel Prize in Physiology or Medicine
 June 13 – Abdulsalami Abubakar, President of Nigeria
 June 16 
 Giacomo Agostini, Italian motorcycle racer
 John Rostill, English bassist, musician and composer (d. 1973)
 June 17 – Mohamed El Baradei, Egyptian International Atomic Energy Agency director, recipient of the Nobel Peace Prize
 June 18
 Roger Ebert, American film critic and television personality (d. 2013)
 Thabo Mbeki, South African politician and 12th President of South Africa
 Paul McCartney, English musician and composer
 Carl Radle, American bass guitarist
 Nick Tate, Australian actor
 Hans Vonk, Dutch conductor (d. 2004)
 June 20 – Brian Wilson, American singer, composer and producer (The Beach Boys)
 June 21 – Flaviano Vicentini, Italian cyclist (d. 2002)
 June 22
 Toyohiro Akiyama, Japanese cosmonaut
 Eumir Deodato, Brazilian pianist, composer, arranger and producer
 Laila Freivalds, Swedish politician
 June 23 – Martin Rees, British cosmologist and astrophysicist
 June 24 
 Michele Lee, American actress and singer
 Eduardo Frei Ruiz-Tagle, Chilean politician and 33rd President of Chile
 June 25 
 Willis Reed, African-American basketball player, coach and general manager
 Michel Tremblay, French-Canadian novelist and playwright
 June 26
 Gilberto Gil, Brazilian singer, politician
 Larry Taylor, American bass guitarist (Canned Heat) (d. 2019)
 June 27 – Bruce Johnston, American singer and songwriter (The Beach Boys)
 June 28 
 Chris Hani, South African politician (d. 1993)
 Rupert Sheldrake, British biochemist
 Frank Zane, American professional bodybuilder and author
 June 30
 Robert Ballard, American explorer, Navy officer and professor
 Jean-Baptiste Ouédraogo, 4th President of Burkina Faso
 Friedrich von Thun, Austrian actor

July

 July 1
 Geneviève Bujold, Canadian actress
 Andraé Crouch, American gospel singer (d. 2015)
 Izzat Ibrahim al-Douri, 6th Vice President of Iraq (d. 2020)
 Wim T. Schippers, Dutch artist, comedian, television director, and voice actor
 Timothy Yang, Taiwanese diplomat and politician
 July 2 
 Vicente Fox, 55th President of Mexico
 Mukhtar Shakhanov, Kazakh writer and lawmaker
 Ahmet Türk, Kurdish nationalist
 Juan Cutillas, footballer and Spanish soccer coach 
 July 3
 Kevin Johnson, Australian singer-songwriter
 Eddy Mitchell, French singer and actor
 July 4 – Prince Michael of Kent
 July 5 
 Louise Shaffer, American actress, script writer, and author
 Hannes Löhr, German footballer (d. 2016)
 July 6 – Raymond Depardon, French photographer, photojournalist and documentary filmmaker
 July 7 
 Carmen Duncan, Australian actress and activist (d. 2019)
 Abdul Hamid II, Pakistani field hockey player
 Thomas D. Pollard, American educator, cell biologist and biophysicist
 July 9 – Richard Roundtree, American actor
 July 10
 Ronnie James Dio, American musician (d. 2010)
 Pyotr Klimuk, Russian cosmonaut
 Mirjana Marković, Serbian politician, 3rd First Lady of Yugoslavia (d. 2019)
 Lopo do Nascimento, 1st Prime Minister of Angola
 Sixto Rodriguez, American singer-songwriter
 July 11
 Tomasz Stańko, Polish trumpeter, composer and improviser (d. 2018)
 Jean Jourden, French cyclist
 Vitorino, Portuguese singer-songwriter
 July 13
 Harrison Ford, American actor
 Roger McGuinn, American musician (The Byrds)
 July 14 – Javier Solana, Spanish politician and diplomat
 July 15 – Mil Máscaras, Mexican professional wrestler
 July 16 – Margaret Court, Australian tennis player
 July 17
 Connie Hawkins, American basketball player (d. 2017)
 Zoot Money, English vocalist, keyboardist and bandleader
 July 18 
 Prince Alexandre of Belgium (d. 2009)
 Giacinto Facchetti, Italian footballer (d. 2006)
 Adolf Ogi, member of the Swiss Federal Council
 July 19 – Frederick Kantor, American physicist
 July 20 – Salvatore Lo Piccolo, Italian mafioso
 July 21 
 Alfred Gomolka, German politician
 Véronique Vendell, French actress
 July 22 – Toyohiro Akiyama, Japanese TV journalist and astronaut
 July 23 – Myra Hindley, English multiple murderer (d. 2002)
 July 24 – Chris Sarandon, American actor
 July 26 – Hannelore Elsner, German actress (d. 2019)
 July 27 – Dennis Ralston, American tennis player
 July 29 – Tony Sirico, American actor (d. 2022)

August

 August 1 
 Jerry Garcia, American musician (d. 1995)
 Giancarlo Giannini, Italian actor
 August 2 – Isabel Allende, Chilean writer
 August 4 
 Don S. Davis, American actor (d. 2008)
 David Lange, 32nd Prime Minister of New Zealand (d. 2005)
 August 6 – Evelyn Hamann, German actress (d. 2007)
 August 7
 Tobin Bell, American actor
 Garrison Keillor, American writer and radio host
 Carlos Monzón, Argentine professional boxer (d. 1995)
 Caetano Veloso, Brazilian composer, singer, guitarist, writer, and political activist
 August 9
 Miguel Littín, Chilean film director, screenwriter, film producer and novelist
 David Steinberg, Canadian comedian, actor, writer, director, and author
 August 10 – Agepê, Brazilian singer/composer (d. 1995)
 August 13
 Hissène Habré, 1st Prime Minister and 5th President of Chad (d. 2021)
 Robert L. Stewart, American astronaut
August 17 – Muslim Magomayev, Soviet, Azerbaijani and Russian singer (d. 2008)
 August 20 – Isaac Hayes, American singer and actor (d. 2008)
 August 22 – Uğur Mumcu, Turkish journalist and writer (d. 1993)
 August 23
 Nancy Richey, American tennis player
 Susana Vieira, Brazilian actress
 August 24 
 Hans Peter Korff, German actor
 Karen Uhlenbeck, American mathematician
 August 25
 Imogen Hassall, English actress (d. 1980)
 Howard Jacobson, British novelist and journalist
 August 26 – John E. Blaha, American astronaut
 August 27 
Daryl Dragon, American musician (d. 2019)
Tom Belsø, Danish motor racing driver (d. 2020)
 August 28 – José Eduardo dos Santos, 2nd President of Angola (d. 2022)
 August 29 – Sterling Morrison, American musician (d. 1995) 
 August 30 – John Kani, South African actor, director and playwright

September

 September 1 – C. J. Cherryh, American writer
 September 2 – Robert Shapiro, American lawyer and entrepreneur
 September 3
 Michael Hui, Hong Kong film comedian
 Al Jardine, American musician 
 September 4 – Raymond Floyd, American golfer
 September 5 
 Denise Fabre, French television personality
 Werner Herzog, German filmmaker
 Eduardo Mata, Mexican conductor and composer (d. 1995)
 September 6
 Mel McDaniel, American country singer (d. 2011)
 Carol Wayne, American television and film actress (d. 1985)
 September 7 – Alan Oakes, English footballer
 September 8 – Želimir Žilnik, Serbian film director
 September 11 – Lola Falana, American singer, dancer, model and actress
 September 13 – Hissène Habré, 7th President of Chad
 September 14
 Arturo Macapagal, Filipino shooter (d. 2015) 
 Bernard MacLaverty, Irish writer
 September 15 
 Robert Lau Hoi Chew, Malaysian politician (d. 2010)
 Wen Jiabao, Premier of the People's Republic of China 
 Emmerson Mnangagwa, 3rd President of Zimbabwe 
 September 17 – Lupe Ontiveros, American actress (d. 2012)
 September 18 – Wolfgang Schäuble, German politician
 September 19 – Freda Payne, American singer and actress
 September 20 – Rose Francine Rogombé, Gabonese lawyer and politician (d. 2015)
 September 21, Luis Mateo Díez, Spanish writer
 September 22
 Wu Ma, Chinese film actor, director, producer and writer (d. 2014)
 Marlena Shaw, American jazz singer
 David Stern, American commissioner of the National Basketball Association (d. 2020)
 September 25 – Dee Dee Warwick, American singer (d. 2008)
 September 26 – Ingrid Becker, German athlete
 September 28
 Marshall Bell, American actor
 Pierre Clémenti, French actor (d. 1999)
 Tim Maia, Brazilian musician, songwriter and businessman (d. 1998)
 Justinian Rweyemamu, Tanzania’s first major economics scholar (d. 1982)
 September 29
 Felice Gimondi, Italian racing cyclist (d. 2019)
 Madeline Kahn, American actress (d. 1999)
 Ian McShane, English actor
 Bill Nelson, American politician and astronaut
 Jean-Luc Ponty, French jazz violinist
 September 30 
 Gus Dudgeon, English record producer (d. 2002)
 Frankie Lymon, American singer (d. 1968)
 Sture Pettersson, Swedish cyclist (d. 1983)

October

 October 1 – Günter Wallraff, German investigative journalist
Jean-Pierre Jabouille, French F1 driver (d. 2023)
 October 2 – Asha Parekh, Indian actress, film director and producer
 October 3
 Earl Hindman, American actor (d. 2003)
 Roberto Perfumo, Argentine footballer and sports commentator (d. 2016)
 October 6 – Britt Ekland, Swedish actress
 October 7
 Ronald Baecker, American computer scientist
 Joy Behar, American comedian and television personality
 October 8
 Stanley Bates, British actor and screenwriter
 Nguyễn Minh Triết, 6th President of Vietnam
 October 9 – Shukri Ghanem, Libyan politician (d. 2012)
 October 10
 Janis Hansen, American singer and author (d. 2017)
 Radu Vasile, Prime Minister of Romania (d. 2013)
 October 11 – Amitabh Bachchan, Indian actor, film producer, and television host
 October 12 – Daliah Lavi, Israeli actress and singer (d. 2017)
 October 13
 Rutanya Alda, Latvian-American actress
 Jerry Jones, American football team owner
 October 19 – Andrew Vachss, American author and attorney (d. 2021)
 October 20
 Christel DeHaan, German-American businesswoman and philanthropist (d. 2020)
 Arto Paasilinna, Finnish writer (d. 2018)
 Christiane Nüsslein-Volhard, German biologist, recipient of the Nobel Prize in Physiology or Medicine
 October 21 – Judy Sheindlin, American retired judge turned television personality (Judge Judy)
 October 22
 Bobby Fuller, American rock singer, songwriter, and guitarist (d. 1966)
 Annette Funicello, American actress and singer (d. 2013)
 Pedro Morales, Puerto Rican professional wrestler (d. 2019)
 October 23 
 Michael Crichton, American author (d. 2008)
 Anita Roddick, British businesswoman, human rights activist and campaigner (d. 2007)
 October 24 – Frank Delaney, Irish-born novelist, journalist and broadcaster (d. 2017)
 October 25 – Gloria Katz, American screenwriter and film producer (d. 2018)
 October 26 – Bob Hoskins, British actor (d. 2014)
 October 27 
 Philip Catherine, Belgian jazz guitarist
 Lee Greenwood, American country singer and songwriter
 October 28 – Kees Verkerk, Dutch speed skater
 October 29 – Bob Ross, American painter and television presenter (d. 1995)
 October 31
 George Brizan, 8th Prime Minister of Grenada (d. 2012)
 David Ogden Stiers, American actor and voice-over artist (d. 2018)

November

 November 1
 Larry Flynt, American publisher (Hustler) (d. 2021)
 Ralph Klein, Canadian politician (d. 2013)
 Marcia Wallace, American actress and comedian (d. 2013)
 November 2
 Shere Hite, American-born German sexologist (d. 2020)
 Stefanie Powers, American actress
 November 5 – Pierangelo Bertoli, Italian singer-songwriter (d. 2002)
 November 6 – Jean Shrimpton, English model and actress
 November 7 
 Tom Peters, American writer
 Johnny Rivers, American musician, singer and songwriter
 November 8
 Angel Cordero Jr., Puerto Rican jockey
 Sandro Mazzola, Italian footballer
 Fernando Sorrentino, Argentine writer
 November 10
 Robert F. Engle, American economist, Nobel Prize laureate
 Hans-Rudolf Merz, Swiss federal councillor 
November 11 – K. Connie Kang, Korean American journalist and author (d. 2019) 
 November 15 – Daniel Barenboim, Argentine-born pianist and conductor
 November 16 – Joanna Pettet, British-born Canadian actress
 November 17
 Derek Clayton, Australian long-distance runner
 Bob Gaudio, American musician
 Kang Kek Iew, Cambodian politician and criminal (d. 2020)
 István Rosztóczy, Hungarian microbiologist (d. 1993)
 Martin Scorsese, American film director
 November 18
 Linda Evans, American actress
 Susan Sullivan, American actress
 November 19 – Calvin Klein, American fashion designer
 November 20 
 Joe Biden, 46th President of the United States
 Bob Einstein, American actor, producer and screenwriter (d. 2019)
 November 21 – Al Matthews, African-American actor and singer (d. 2018)
 November 22 
 Francis K. Butagira, Ugandan ambassador
 Dick Stockton, American sports announcer
 Guion Bluford, African-American astronaut
 November 23 – Susan Anspach, American actress (d. 2018)
 November 24 – Billy Connolly, Scottish comedian and singer
 November 25 – Rosa von Praunheim, German film director, author and painter
 November 26 – Olivia Cole, African-American actress (d. 2018)
 November 27
 Manolo Blahnik, Spanish shoe designer
 Jimi Hendrix, American guitarist (d. 1970)
 November 28 – Eric Shinseki, American U.S. Army General
 November 29
 Michael Craze, British actor (d. 1998)
 Philippe Huttenlocher, Swiss baritone
 November 30 – André Brahic, French astrophysicist (d. 2016)

December

 December 1 – John Clauser, American quantum physicist, recipient of the Nobel Prize in Physics
 December 2 – Francisque Ravony, 7th Prime Minister of Madagascar (d. 2003)
 December 3 – Alice Schwarzer, German feminist, founder and publisher of German feminist journal EMMA
 December 4 
 William “Red” Dawson, American football player and coach 
 Al Hunt, American columnist 
 Gemma Jones, British actress
 December 6
 Chelsea Brown, American actress (d. 2017)
 Peter Handke, Austrian novelist
 December 7
 Harry Chapin, American singer-songwriter (d. 1981)
 Reginald Lewis, American businessman (d. 1993)
 Peter Tomarken, American game-show host (d. 2006)
 December 8 – Toots Hibbert, Jamaican reggae singer-songwriter (d. 2020)
 December 9
 Dick Butkus, American football player
 Billy Bremner, Scottish footballer (d. 1997) 
 December 17
 Muhammadu Buhari, Nigerian army general and 15th President of Nigeria
 Paul Butterfield, American musician (d. 1987)
 December 19
 Milan Milutinovic, President of Serbia
 Gene Okerlund, American wrestling announcer (d. 2019)
 December 20 – Bob Hayes, African-American athlete (d. 2002)
 December 21
 Hu Jintao, General Secretary of the Chinese Communist Party, 6th President of the People's Republic of China
 Carla Thomas, American singer
 December 27
 Muruga Booker, American drummer, composer, inventor, artist and recording artist
 Charmian Carr, American actress (d. 2016)
 Thomas Menino, 53rd Mayor of Boston, Massachusetts (d. 2014)
 December 29 – Rajesh Khanna, Indian actor (d. 2012)
 December 30
 Betty Aberlin, American actress
 Vladimir Bukovsky, Russian-born British human rights activist and political dissident (d. 2019)
 Anne Charleston, Australian actress
 Allan Gotthelf, American philosopher (d. 2013)
 Michael Nesmith, American musician, singer-songwriter, producer (d. 2021)
 Janko Prunk, Slovenian historian
 Fred Ward, American actor and producer (d. 2022)
 December 31 – Taufiq Kiemas, 5th First Spouse of Indonesia (d. 2013)

Deaths

January

 January 2 – Ivande Kaija, Soviet writer and feminist (b. 1876)
 January 4
 Sydney Fairbrother, British actress (b. 1872)
 Mel Sheppard, American Olympic athlete (b. 1883)
 Otis Skinner, American actor (b. 1858)
 January 6
 Emma Calvé, French soprano (b. 1858)
 Henri de Baillet-Latour, 3rd President of the International Olympic Committee (b. 1876)
 January 8 – Chaudhry Afzal Haq, Indian writer and humanitarian (b. 1891)
 January 9 
 Heber Doust Curtis, American astronomer (b. 1872)
 Jan Graliński, Polish general (b. 1895)
 January 13 
 Vladimir Ignatowski, Soviet physicist (b. 1875)
 Emil Szramek, Polish Roman Catholic priest, martyr and saint (b. 1887)
 Albert Jean Baptiste Marie Vayssière, French biologist and scientist (b. 1854)
 January 16
 Prince Arthur, Duke of Connaught and Strathearn, 2nd youngest son of Queen Victoria (b. 1850)
 Sir Jeremiah Colman, 1st Baronet, British industrialist (b. 1859)
 Carole Lombard, American actress (b. 1908)
 January 17 – Walther von Reichenau, German field marshal (b. 1884)
 January 18 – James P. Parker, United States Navy commodore (b. 1855)
 January 21 
 Christiaan Cornelissen, Dutch writer, economic and trade unionist (b. 1864)
 Isidoro Diéguez Dueñas, Spanish bricklayer (b. 1909)
 Jesús Larrañaga, Spanish communist leader (b. 1901)
 January 22 
 Walter Sickert, British Impressionist painter (b. 1860)
 Racho Petrov, Bulgarian general and politician, 12th Prime Minister of Bulgaria (b. 1861)
 January 23
 Prince Ludwig Gaston of Saxe-Coburg and Gotha (b. 1870)
 Nazareno Strampelli, Italian agronomist and plant breeder (b. 1866)
 January 26 – Felix Hausdorff, German mathematician (suicide) (b. 1868)
 January 27 – Kaarel Eenpalu, Estonian journalist and politician, 7th Prime Minister of Estonia (b. 1888)
 January 29 – Viktor Esbensen, Norwegian mariner (b. 1881)

February

 February 2
 Ado Birk, Estonian politician, 3rd Prime Minister of Estonia (b. 1883)
 Leonetto Cappiello, Italian poster designer and painter (b. 1875)
 February 7 – Dorando Pietri, Italian Olympic athlete (b. 1885)
 February 8 – Fritz Todt, Nazi German engineer (b. 1891)
 February 9 – Lauri Kristian Relander, 2nd President of Finland (b. 1883)
 February 11
 Jamnalal Bajaj, Indian industrialist and philanthropist (b. 1889)
 Ugo Pasquale Mifsud, 3rd Prime Minister of Malta (b. 1889)
 February 12 – Grant Wood, American painter (b. 1891)
 February 13
 Otakar Batlička, Czechoslovakian adventurer and journalist (b. 1895)
 Epitácio Pessoa, Brazil jurist and politician, 11th President of Brazil (b. 1865)
 February 14 – Mirosław Ferić, Polish WWII fighter pilot (b. 1915)
 February 16 – Ettore Arrigoni degli Oddi, Italian ornithologist (b. 1867)
 February 19 – Frank Abbandando, American gangster (b. 1910)
 February 20 – Hamad ibn Isa Al Khalifa, Ruler of Bahrain (b. 1872)
 February 22 – Stefan Zweig, Austrian writer (b. 1881)
 February 24 – Anton Drexler, German far-right politician (b. 1884) 
 February 27
 Robert William Chapman, Australian engineer and mathematician (b. 1866)
 Joseph Emile Harley, American army officer and politician (b. 1880)
 February 28 – Karel Doorman, Dutch admiral (b. 1889)

March

 March 1
 George S. Rentz, United States Navy Chaplain and Navy Cross winner (b. 1882)
 Cornelius Vanderbilt III, American military officer, inventor, and engineer (b. 1873)
 March 2
 Gustave Anjou, Swedish genealogist (b. 1863)
 Sergei Solovyov, Soviet Orthodox priest and blessed (b. 1885)
 March 3 – Prince Amedeo, Duke of Aosta, Italian nobleman and military officer, Viceroy of Italian East Africa (b. 1898)
 March 4 – Gheorghe Adamescu, Romanian historian and bibliographer (b. 1869)
 March 7 – Pierre Semard, French Communist leader (b. 1887)
 March 8 – José Raúl Capablanca, Cuban chess player (b. 1888)
 March 10 – Frederick Behre, American artist (b. 1863)
 March 11 
 José Camprubí, Spanish publisher (b. 1879)
 Raoul Dandurand, Canadian politician (b. 1861)
 March 12 
 Robert Bosch, German industrialist, engineer and inventor (b. 1861)
 Sir William Henry Bragg, British physicist, chemist and mathematician, Nobel Prize laureate (b. 1862)
 Enric Morera i Viura, Andorran composer (b. 1865) 
 March 14
 René Bull, British illustrator and photographer (b. 1872)
 Friedrich Karl Georg Fedde, German botanist (b. 1873)
 March 15 – Vasile Demetrius, Austro-Hungarian-born Romanian writer, poet and translator (b. 1878)
 March 17 – Nada Dimić, Yugoslav Communist leader (b. 1923)
 March 20 – Vasily Kalafati, Soviet and Russian composer (b. 1869)
 March 21 – J. S. Woodsworth, Canadian politician (b. 1874)
Václav Morávek, Czech general and warrior (b. 1904)
 March 23 
 Ludwig von Höhnel, Austrian naval officer and explorer (b. 1857)
 Marcelo Torcuato de Alvear, 20th President of Argentina (b. 1868)
 March 26 – Gustav Hinrichs, German-born American conductor and composer (b. 1850)
 March 27 
 Jannion Steele Elliott, British ornithologist and naturalist (b. 1871)
 John W. Wilcox Jr., American admiral (lost overboard) (b. 1882)
 Julio González, Spanish sculptor and painter (b. 1876)
 March 28 – Miguel Hernández, Spanish poet and playwright (b. 1910)

April
 
 April 2 – Édouard Estaunié, French novelist (b. 1862)
 April 4 
 James Bede, American politician (b. 1856)
 Jan Daszewski, Polish fighter pilot (b. 1916)
 April 6 – Isidro Michel López, Mexican military officer, leader of the Mexican Revolution (b. 1870)
 April 7 – Anandshankar Dhruv, Indian scholar, writer, educationist and editor (b. 1869)
 April 11 – Frederick Hobbs, New Zealand-born singer and actor (b. 1874)
 April 12 – Arnold Keppel, 8th Earl of Albemarle, British soldier and politician (b. 1858)
 April 13
 Julia Danzas, Soviet and Russian Roman Catholic religious leader and blessed (b. 1879)
 Sir James Fergusson, British admiral (b. 1881)
 April 15 
 Robert Musil, Austrian novelist (b. 1880)
 Joshua Pim, Irish tennis player (b. 1869)
 April 16 – Princess Alexandra of Saxe-Coburg and Gotha, granddaughter of Queen Victoria (b. 1878)
 April 17
 Renward Brandstetter, Swiss philologist and linguist (b. 1860)
 Adolph Daniel Edward Elmer, American botanist (b. 1870)
 Jean Baptiste Perrin, French physicist, Nobel Prize laureate (b. 1870)
 April 18
 Grażyna Chrostowska, Polish poet and activist (b. 1921)
 Gertrude Vanderbilt Whitney, American heiress, socialite and sculptor (b. 1875)
 April 21 – Gustav Stickley, American furniture designer and architect (b. 1858)
 April 23 – Olga Benário Prestes, German-born Brazilian militant (b. 1908)
 April 24
 Camille du Gast, French pioneer (b. 1868)
 Deenanath Mangeshkar, Indian singer and composer (b. 1900)
 Lucy Maud Montgomery, Canadian writer (b. 1874)
 April 25 – Zygmunt Kisielewski, Polish writer (b. 1882)
 April 30 – Lilian Whiting, American writer and editor (b. 1847)

May

 
 May 1 – José Abad Santos, Filipino chief justice of the Supreme Court (b. 1886)
 May 3 – Thorvald Stauning, 9th Prime Minister of Denmark (b. 1873)
 May 4 – Józef Czempiel, Polish Roman Catholic priest, martyr and blessed (b. 1883)
 May 5 – Habib Pacha Es-Saad, 3rd Prime Minister and 2nd President of Lebanon (b. 1867)
 May 7 – Felix Weingartner, Austrian conductor (b. 1863)
 May 9 – Graham McNamee, American radio announcer (b. 1888)
 May 10 – Joe Weber, American vaudevillian (b. 1867)
 May 11 – Sakutarō Hagiwara, Japanese poet and writer (b. 1886)
 May 12 – Hannu Hannuksela, Finnish general (b. 1893)
 May 14 – Frank Churchill, American composer (b. 1901)
 May 16 
 Kaneko Kentarō, Japanese diplomat and statesman (b. 1853)
 Bronisław Malinowski, Polish anthropologist (b. 1884)
 Maria Michał Kowalski, Polish priest and blessed (b. 1871)
 May 19 – A. E. Waite, British occultist (b. 1857)
 May 20
 John D. Craddock, American politician (b. 1881)
 Charles E. Dietrich, American politician (b. 1889)
 John Goodall, English footballer (b. 1863)
 May 22 
 Stjepan Filipović, Yugoslav national hero (b. 1916)
 Tateo Katō, Japanese fighter ace (b. 1903)
 May 24 – Ivan Horbachevsky, Austrian chemist and politician (b. 1854)
 May 25 – Emanuel Feuermann, Austrian cellist (b. 1902)
 May 27 – Chen Duxiu, General Secretary of the Chinese Communist Party (b. 1879)
 May 29
 John Barrymore, American actor (b. 1882)
 Akiko Yosano, Japanese author and poet (b. 1878)
 May 30 – Félix Cadras, French lace designer and militant (b. 1906)

June

 June 4
 Eusebio Ayala, 29th President of Paraguay (1921–23, 1932–36) (b. 1875)
 Reinhard Heydrich, headed the Nazi Reich Main Security Office and was Reich governor of Bohemia and Moravia (b. 1904)
 Eugene E. Lindsey, United States Navy officer (b. 1905)
 June 5 
 Virginia Lee Corbin, American actress (b. 1910)
 Tamon Yamaguchi, Japanese admiral, killed in action at the Battle of Midway (b. 1892)
 Ryusaku Yanagimoto, Japanese rear admiral, killed in action at the Battle of Midway (b. 1894)
 June 7 – Alan Blumlein, British electronics engineer (b. 1903)
 June 11 
 Charles Berthézenne, French politician (b. 1871)
 Michael Kitzelmann, German army officer (b. 1916)
 June 14 – Fyodor Braun, Soviet-born German scholar (b. 1862)
 June 18 – David Hawthorne, British actor (b. 1888)
Jozef Gabčík, Slovak soldier and resistance fighter, a member of the team part of Operation Anthropoid (b. 1912)
Jan Kubiš, Czech soldier and resistance fighter, a member of the team part of Operation Anthropoid (b. 1913)
Josef Valčík, Czech soldier and resistance fighter, a member of the team part of Operation Anthropoid (b. 1914)
Adolf Opálka, Czech soldier and resistance fighter, a member of the team part of Operation Anthropoid (b. 1915)
 June 19
 Ahmad II of Tunis, Ruler of Tunisia (b. 1862)
 Alois Eliáš, Czech general and politician (b. 1890)
 Frank Irons, American Olympic athlete (b. 1886)
 June 21 – Pope John XIX of Alexandria (b. 1855)
 June 22 – Branko Kadia, Jordan Misja and Perlat Rexhepi, Albanian student activists
 June 23 – William Couper, American sculptor (b. 1853)
 June 25
 Arthur Anderson, Australian architect (b. 1868)
 Zénon Bernard, Luxembourgish communist politician (b. 1893)
 June 26
 John Gary Evans, American politician (b. 1863)
 Stanisław Skarżyński, Polish army officer (b. 1899)
 Gene Stack, 1st American major league baseball player to be drafted during World War II as well as the first to die in service (b. 1920)
 June 30
 Billy Bennett, American actor (b. 1887)
 William Henry Jackson, American photographer (b. 1843)

July

 July 1
 Peadar Toner Mac Fhionnlaoich, Irish-language writer (b. 1857)
 Bolesław Wieniawa-Długoszowski, Polish general, diplomat and politician, Interim President of Poland (b. 1881)
 July 2
 Rudi Čajavec, Yugoslav poet (b. 1911)
 Joseph Domachowski, American politician (b. 1872)
 July 4 – Józef Kowalski, Polish Roman Catholic priest and blessed (b. 1911)
 July 8
 Louis Franchet d'Espèrey, French general (b. 1856)
 Refik Saydam, 4th Prime Minister of Turkey (b. 1881)
 July 9 
 Kelly Harrell, American surburbia musician (b. 1889)
 Pauline of the Agonizing Heart of Jesus, Brazilian Roman Catholic religious sister and saint (b. 1865)
 July 12 – Mary Hayden, Irish historian and activist (b. 1862)
 July 13 – Joaquín Sánchez de Toca, Spanish conservative politician and Prime Minister of Spain (b. 1852)
 July 14 – Sébastien Faure, French anarchist and activist (b. 1858)
 July 15 
 Wenceslao Vinzons, Filipino politician and resistance leader (bayoneted to death) (b. 1910)
 Roberto María Ortiz, 24th President of Argentina (b. 1886)
 July 16 – Sir Alfred Flux, British economist and statistician (b. 1867)
 July 17 – Tinus de Jongh, South African painter (b. 1885)
 July 18 
 George Beeby, Australian politician, judge and author (b. 1869)
 George Sutherland, British-born American Supreme Court Justice (b. 1862)
 July 21 – Anton Mervar, Slovenian button accordion manufacturer (b. 1885)
 July 23
 Arístides Chavier Arévalo, Puerto Rican composer and pianist (b. 1867)
 Adam Czerniaków, Polish engineer and senator (suicide) (b. 1880)
 July 24 – Edwin Cooper, British architect (b. 1874)
 July 25 – Tom Reynolds, British actor (b. 1866)
 July 26
 Roberto Arlt, Argentine writer (b. 1900)
 Titus Brandsma, Dutch Discalced Carmelite friar, Roman Catholic priest and blessed (b. 1881)
 July 27
 Karl Pärsimägi, Estonian fauvist painter (b. 1902)
 Georgy Safarov, Bolshevik revolutionary and politician (b. 1891)
 July 28 – Sir Flinders Petrie, British Egyptologist (b. 1853)
 July 29 – Louis Borno, Haitian lawyer and politician, 28th President of Haiti (b. 1865)
 July 30
 Jimmy Blanton, American bassist (b. 1918)
 Leopold Mandić, Yugoslav Capuchin friar and Roman Catholic priest and saint (b. 1866)
 July 31 
 Jožka Jabůrková, Czechoslovakan journalist, writer and translator (b. 1896)
 Sir Francis Younghusband, British explorer and army officer (b.1863)

August

 August 3
 Franciszka Arnsztajnowa, Polish poet and playwright (b. 1865)
 James Cruze, American actor and director (b. 1884)
 Guglielmo Ferrero, Italian historian, journalist and novelist (b. 1871)
 Gustav Indrebø, Norwegian philologist (b. 1889)
 Richard Willstätter, German chemist, Nobel Prize laureate (b. 1872)
 August 7 
 Louis J. Carpellotti, American marine (b. 1918)
 Charles E. Ford, American film director and producer (b. 1899)
 Janusz Korczak, Polish educator, author and pediatrician (b. 1878)
 August 8 – Leopold Janikowski, Polish explorer and ethnographer (b. 1855)
 August 9 – Terea Benedicta of the Cross, German philosopher, Roman Catholic nun, martyr and saint (assassinated) (b. 1891)
 August 10 – Kazimierz Dembowski, Polish Roman Catholic clergyman and martyr (b. 1912)
 August 11 – Sabina Spielrein, Russian physician and psychoanalyst (b. 1885)
 August 12 
 Pasquale Amato, Italian baritone (b. 1878)
 Mykola Burachek, Soviet painter (b. 1871)
 Phillips Holmes, American actor (b. 1907)
 August 13 
 Jorge Cuesta, Mexican chemist, writer and editor (b. 1903)
 Elina González Acha de Correa Morales, Argentinian educator, scientist and activist (b. 1861)
 August 15 – Mahadev Desai, Indian independence activist and writer (b. 1892)
 August 16 – André Heuzé, French director, screenwriter and playwright (b. 1880)
 August 18 
 Agathe Lasch, German philologist (b. 1879)
 Henry DeWitt Hamilton, American general (b. 1863)
 August 19 – Heinrich Rauchinger, Polish-born Austrian painter (b. 1858)
 August 21 – Kiyonao Ichiki, Japanese army officer (killed in action) (b. 1892)
 August 22 – Michel Fokine, Soviet choreographer and dancer (b. 1880)
 August 23
 Jorge Colaço, Portuguese painter (b. 1868)
 Franciszek Dachtera, Polish Roman Catholic priest, martyr and blessed (b. 1910)
 August 24 
 Doyle Clayton Barnes, American naval aviator (b. 1912)
 Edward Kaźmierski, Polish Roman Catholic priest, martyr and blessed (b. 1919)
 August 25
 Prince George, Duke of Kent, 4th eldest son of George V (b. 1902)
 Józef Lewartowski, Polish politician and revolutionary (b. 1895)
 August 26 – Irena Bernášková, Czechoslovakian journalist and resistance member (b. 1904)
 August 27 – Lev Nussimbaum, Russian and Azerbaijani novelist (b. 1905)
 August 28 – Archduke Joseph Ferdinand of Austria (b. 1872)
 August 29 
 Charles Urban, American film producer (b. 1867)
 Fabio Fiallo, Dominican writer, poet and politician (b. 1866)
 Dominik Jędrzejewski, Polish Roman Catholic priest, martyr and blessed (b. 1886)
 August 30 – Martin Kirschner, German surgeon (b. 1869)

September

 September 1 – Clotilde Apponyi, Hungarian women's rights activist and diplomat (b. 1867)
 September 3 – Rubén Ruiz Ibárruri, Spanish communist leader (b. 1920)
 September 4 – Herbert A. Calcaterra, American navy sailor (b. 1920)
 September 5 – François de Labouchère, French pilot (b. 1917)
 September 7 – Cecilia Beaux, American portraitist (b. 1855)
 September 8 – Adam Bargielski, Polish Roman Catholic priest, martyr and blessed (b. 1903)
 September 9 – Adele Kurzweil, Austrian Holocaust victim (b. 1925)
 September 14 
 Sister Fausta Labrador, Filipino Roman Catholic nun and Servant of God (b. 1858)
 E. S. Gosney, American philanthropist and eugenicist (b. 1855)
 September 20 – Kanaklata Barua, Indian freedom fighter (b. 1924)
 September 27 
 Fernando Díaz de Mendoza y Guerrero, Spanish actor (b. 1897)
 Bronisław Kostkowski, Polish Roman Catholic priest, martyr and blessed (b. 1915)
 September 29 – Matangini Hazra, Indian revolutionary (shot) (b. 1870)
 September 30
 Hans-Joachim Marseille, German World War II fighter ace (b. 1919)
 Leonīds Breikšs, Latvian poet, journalist and patriot (b. 1908)
 William V. Pacelli, American politician (b. 1893)

October

 October 1 – Ants Piip, 7th Prime Minister and 1st State Elder of Estonia (b. 1884)
 October 3 
 Ludwik Ćwikliński, Prussian philologist and professor (b. 1853)
 Olaf Huseby, Norwegian-born American publisher (b. 1856)
 October 5 – Giuseppe Cassioli, Italian painter and sculptor (b. 1865)
 October 6 
 Lorenzo Aguirre, Spanish painter (b. 1884)
 Wacław Wąsowicz, Polish painter (b. 1891)
 October 7 – Maria Antonina Kratochwil, Polish Roman Catholic nun, martyr and blessed (b. 1881)
 October 8 – Effie Ellsler, American actress (b. 1855)
 October 9 – William T. Hanna, American marine (b. 1920)
 October 10 – Arnold Majewski, Finnish military hero of Polish descent (killed in action) (b. 1892)
 October 12 – Aritomo Gotō, Japanese admiral (killed in action) (b. 1888)
 October 13 – Hong Yi, born Li Shutong, Chinese Buddhist artist, art teacher (b. 1880)
 October 15 – Dame Marie Tempest, British actress (b. 1864)
 October 18 – Federico Ferrari Orsi, Italian army officer (b. 1886)
 October 19 – Paul Nikolaus Cossmann, German journalist (b. 1869)
 October 20 – May Robson, Australian actress (b. 1858)
 October 22 – Staf De Clercq, Belgian collaborator and nationalist (b. 1884)
 October 23 – Ralph Rainger, American composer and songwriter (b. 1901)
 October 24
 Dimitri Amilakhvari, French military officer (b. 1906)
 St John Hutchinson, British barrister and politician (b. 1884)
 James C. Morton, American actor (b. 1884)
 October 26 – William Finnemann, Filipino Roman Catholic priest, archbishop and servant of God (b. 1882)
 October 27 – Helmuth Hübener, German youth political activist against the Hitler regime (b. 1925)
 October 28 – Alexander von Dassel, German magistrate (b. 1854)
 October 31 – Emilio Caldara, Italian politician (b. 1868)

November

 November 1 – Hugo Distler, German composer (b. 1908)
 November 2 – Elihu Grant, American scholar and writer (b. 1873)
 November 3 
 Eric Abrahamsson, Swedish actor (b. 1890)
 Amédé Ardoin, American musician (b. 1898)
 November 5 
 George M. Cohan, American songwriter and entertainer (b. 1878)
 Kiyoura Keigo, Prime Minister of Japan (b. 1850)
 November 9 – Edna May Oliver, American actress (b. 1883)
 November 11
 Hector Abbas, Dutch actor (b. 1884)
 Merton Beckwith-Smith, British army officer (b. 1890)
 November 12 – Laura Hope Crews, American actress (b. 1879)
 November 13
 Daniel J. Callaghan, American admiral and Medal of Honor recipient (b. 1890)
 Norman Scott, American admiral and Medal of Honor recipient (b. 1889)
 November 15 – Prince Heinrich XXXIII Reuss of Köstritz (b. 1879)
 November 16 – Joseph Schmidt, Polish tenor (b. 1904)
 November 19
 Ilya Fondaminsky, Soviet author (b. 1880)
 Bruno Schulz, Polish writer and painter (shot) (b. 1892)
 November 21 
 Count Leopold Berchtold, Austro-Hungarian foreign minister (b. 1863)
 J. B. M. Hertzog, Boer General and 3rd Prime Minister of South Africa (b. 1866)
 November 23
 Tomitarō Horii, Japanese general (b. 1890)
 Hernando Siles Reyes, Bolivian politician, 31st President of Bolivia (b. 1882)
 November 24
 Guido Masiero, Italian World War I flying ace and aviation pioneer (b. 1895)
 Francesco Agello, Italian aviator (b. 1902)
 November 25 – Mihail Dragomirescu, Romanian aesthetician, theorist and critic (b. 1868)
 November 26
 Mohammad Ali Foroughi, Iranian diplomat, politician, teacher and writer, 3-time Prime Minister of Iran (b. 1877)
 Sigtryggur Jonasson, Canadian politician (b. 1852)
 November 27 – Hermann Harms, German botanist (b. 1870)
 November 28 – Marceli Nowotko, Polish activist (b. 1893)
 November 29 – William Stamps Farish II, American pioneer (b. 1881)
 November 30 – Buck Jones, American actor (b. 1891)

December

 December 1
 Teddy Sheean, Royal Australian Navy sailor, killed in action at the Battle of Timor (b. 1923)
 Leon Wachholz, Polish scientist and medical examiner (b. 1867)
 December 3 – Wilhelm Junk, Czechoslovakian natural historian, bibliographer and entomologist (b. 1866)
 December 5 – Richard Tucker, American actor (b. 1884)
 December 6
 Karl Herxheimer, German dermatologist (b. 1861)
 Amos Rusie, American baseball player and MLB Hall of Famer (b. 1871)
 December 7 – Orland Steen Loomis, Governor of Wisconsin (b. 1893)
 December 8 
 Prince Eitel Friedrich of Prussia (b. 1883)
 Albert Kahn, American architect (b. 1869)
 December 9 – Séraphine Louis, French painter (b. 1864)
 December 12 
 Robert Danneberg, Austrian politician (b. 1882)
 Helen Westley, American actress (b. 1875)
 December 13
 Hakeem Fateh Mohammad Sehwani, Indian scholar, poet, literary, journalist and politician (b. 1882)
 Wlodimir Ledóchowski, Polish Jesuit priest and servant of God (b. 1866)
 December 17 – Edith Pretty, British landowner (b. 1883)
 December 19 – Carl Gustav Fleischer, Norwegian general (b. 1883)
 December 21 – Franz Boas, German anthropologist (b. 1858)
 December 22
 Robert Kosch, Prussian general (b. 1856)
 Richard-Heinrich von Reuss, German General, KIA at Stalingrad (b, 1896).
 December 23 – Konstantin Balmont, Soviet poet and translator (b. 1867)
 December 24 – François Darlan, French admiral and politician, 81st Prime Minister of France (assassinated) (b. 1881)
 December 27 – William G. Morgan, American inventor of volleyball (b. 1870)
 December 30 – Sir Neville Henderson, British diplomat (b. 1882)

References